This is a list of villains in the television show VR Troopers.

Ziktor Industries
Ziktor Industries is a company owned by the fictional Karl Ziktor, A.K.A. Grimlord. The company served as his base of operations from the other side of the reality barrier. It is operated as ruthlessly as the virtual world and is poorly regarded by many of Cross World City's citizens. However, no one (the Troopers  and Professor Hart included) is aware that Ziktor and Grimlord are the same person.

Very little is seen of the building except for the exterior (taken from Metalder) and Ziktor's office. Throughout the show's run, the office scenes mostly serve as a bridge into Ziktor's transformation into Grimlord and most of his actions take place in Virtual Reality than here. The sole pieces of equipment are an energy orb (as seen in season one) or an energy prism (as seen in season two) which Ziktor uses to become Grimlord and an intercom to communicate with agents who eventually become Skugs in each episode.

Occupants
Ziktor Industries' main occupants are few in number, and the episodes feature Ziktor surrounded by tall, ice cold women in black leather and high heels (all of which really are Skugs), a scientist named Strickland (also a Skug), or other agents he had previously attached to assignments and who arrive to report their progress (who are revealed to be Skugs in each episode). Ziktor also has a pet iguana named Juliet whom he occasionally strokes and pampers while gloating.

Major Villains
The VR Troopers fight the forces of Grimlord and his minions to keep their armies from invading the Earth reality:

Grimlord

Grimlord (portrayed by Gardner Baldwin) was the alter ego of billionaire Karl Ziktor, the owner of Ziktor Industries and the primary enemy of the VR Troopers television series. Many years ago, Grimlord was responsible for the capture of scientist Tyler Steele and the near death of Professor Horatio Hart forcing Hart to remain in virtual reality to stay alive. Grimlord, during the same measures taken above, also accessed a source of Tyler's and Hart's experiments in Inter-reality travel and gained the incredible powers required to access cyberspace.

Upon arriving in Virtual Reality, Grimlord soon assembled a fierce army of mutants and cyborgs commanding them from a place of authority. In the first season, this was the Virtual Dungeon. In the second season, it was the orbiting Virtual Dark Fortress. He also appointed several mutants and cyborgs as authority figures themselves including General Ivar and Colonel Icebot. In perhaps the greatest irony, Grimlord transformed Tyler into Dark Heart, yet Dark Heart turned traitor after Ryan freed him from execution. When Ryan and Dark Heart confronted Grimlord, he ended up escaping after setting the Virtual Dungeon to self-destruct. When Dark Heart regressed back to Tyler Steele, Grimlord abducted Tyler with his magic as he still needed Tyler for his next plot.

Grimlord, like the Troopers, had a civilian identity and can travel between both realities on a regular basis. He uses a transference orb placed on the desk of his office and chants, "Forces of Darkness, empower me! Take me back to my virtual reality!" As the blinds behind him close (showing the Cross World City skyline, which was really a mural of such), the orb sends a current of energy into his body changing his physical appearance. Upon transformation, he is taken to the throne room of his command center.

Like most heartless supervillains, Grimlord cared very little for his army and henchmen. Grimlord would generally lose his patience with them quite easily when they report a complication or failure. His constant defeats by the Troopers causes a frequent irradiation in enraged eyes and a clenched fist at the conclusion of every episode. Grimlord is not above destroying his own base to kill the Troopers as displayed three times in the series (twice with the Dungeon, and once with a cave he was temporarily using after the former's final destruction). In the second season, Grimlord attempted to trap Ryan in another dimension just to prevent the Troopers from learning his name in reality. In fact, no one, not even the Troopers or Professor Hart, knew that Grimlord and Karl Ziktor were one and the same.

In the second season, Grimlord underwent a drastic change in appearance and format after self-destructing the Virtual Dungeon for a second time. With barely any footage of his counterpart existing for use anymore, Saban upgraded Grimlord into an American exclusive character and base of operations. Siphoning off Tyler Steele's knowledge of Virtual Reality into an energy prism (which resembled a green crystal), Ziktor discarded his traditional orb (which was destroyed by his women) and used this prism to access a whole new army of Virtual creations and a new base of operations called the Virtual Dark Fortress. He now had an appearance that slightly resembled his old appearance with a cape and this form also included having a long tail. He was no longer confined to sitting on a throne and also had the ability to teleport to different places at will.

General Ivar
General Ivar (voiced by Mike Reynolds) is not only a robot that can transform into a rocket, but also a military strategist and chief commander of much of Grimlord's outer aerial and ground forces. Ivar occasionally battles the Troopers in various vehicles, but seldom fights one on one. In one episode, Ivar had plotted mutiny with the aid of a stolen military brain. His mutiny resulted in what appeared to be his ultimate destruction at the hands of JB. However, Grimlord still thought that Ivar was valuable, so Grimlord's forces retrieved Ivar's remains and rebuilt him. General Ivar (along with Colonel Icebot, Fighterbot, and Air Stryker) is one of the few survivors of the Virtual Dungeon's destruction and remains with Grimlord after he upgrades to the Virtual Dark Fortress.

Colonel Icebot
Colonel Icebot (voiced by Richard Epcar) is much more reserved than Ivar. He rarely fights at all, and serves as Grimlord's chief science officer as well as commander and developer of many aerial assault vehicles and inventions. In his only battle, Colonel Icebot gained the ability to change into a monster to battle JB and Kaitlin. Following the Virtual Dungeon's destruction, Colonel Icebot serves Grimlord in Season Two in the same capacity as before. Colonel Icebot has no ice attacks or abilities.

Virtual Dungeon
The Virtual Dungeon is Grimlord's first primary base. The footage of these characters is taken from the Japanese tokusatsu series Choujinki Metalder and Jikuu Senshi Spielban, two of the three such series that VR Troopers is adapted from (and both of which were used in the first season).

After Karl Ziktor uses the orb on his desk to turn into Grimlord, he teleports to the Virtual Dungeon where his servants say "Hail, Grimlord! Master of the Virtual World!"

The Dungeon also has a self-destruction system (similar to a time bomb) that was used twice: The first was in Part 4 of the "Defending Dark Heart" mini-series, where Ryan and Tyler Steele (as Dark Heart) faced Grimlord, who set the Dungeon to vaporize; and the second was in Part 2 of the "Quest for Power" mini-series when Ryan went in to rescue Tyler and Jeb, as Grimlord set the Dungeon to actually self-destruct with Ryan and Jeb still inside (they eventually survived). In both cases, the system utilized a 2-screen timer that showed the minutes on the left screen and the seconds on the right, and the timer was set to 3 minutes.

Key Lieutenants
Grimlord has high-ranking lieutenants who are leaders of his many mutants and cyborgs. The original four lieutenants were Decimator, Zelton, Toxoid and Blue Boar.

Decimator
Decimator (voiced by Michael Sorich) is an expert swordsman and the most active warrior of Grimlords' key lieutenants. Decimator was the first to deal Ryan a mortal blow in the first episode, nearly killing the inexperienced Trooper. He is mostly seen among the armored and cyborg members of Grimlord's army. Ryan and Decimator clashed frequently over the first season until Decimator wasn't seen again since Grimlord destroyed the Virtual Dungeon.

Zelton
Zelton (voiced by Michael Sorich) is one of Grimlord's high ranked robotic warriors and key lieutenants who is sometimes seen amongst the robotic members of Grimlord's army. In one of his notable battles with Ryan Steele, Zelton was given the ability to transform and utilize the powers of other robotic warriors from Grimlord's army since it was made from the power of them. Regarding his most infamous battle with Ryan, Zelton was able to transform into Cannonbot, Graybot, Metalbot, and Renegade. After a hard and enduring battle, Ryan defeated Zelton. Zelton was impressed by Ryan's skills and saluted him as his equal. Displeased with Zelton's honor, Decimator activated Zelton's self-destruct. Zelton was shortly restored afterwards. Zelton has not been seen since Grimlord self-destructed the Virtual Dungeon.

Toxoid
Toxoid (voiced by Dave Mallow) is another of Grimlord's key lieutenants. Toxoid was a mutant beast with a high pitched voice that wore green body armor with his skull-like head encased in a clear dome. Toxoid's other abilities included teleportation and shooting goo out of his fingers. He has also had the most opportunities to battle Ryan Steele personally, but either loses or runs away each time. Toxoid is looked down upon the most due to his limited intellect and cowardly behavior. He was often seen among the organic-looking creatures in Grimlord's army. He was never seen again after Grimlord self-destructed the Virtual Dungeon.

Blue Boar
Blue Boar (voiced by Mike Reynolds) is one of Grimlord's key lieutenants who commands the Gunbots and is seen amongst them and any other weapon-based robot. He is a large red and bluish steel robot with a head closely resembling a boar, as his name suggests. In one hand he held a sword while his other hand was large. This served as a shield plus each finger was a small cannon. In his only notable battle, he fought by Ryan while JB dealt with Vanbot. Ryan managed to defeat him using his "Lightning Hand" command. Even though he was destroyed, Grimlord had him rebuilt. He wasn't seen again after Grimlord self-destructed the Virtual Dungeon.

Dark Heart
Dark Heart (voiced by Kerrigan Mahan in the first appearance, Richard Epcar in the second appearance) used to be Tyler Steele, father of Ryan Steele. Dark Heart was the fiercest of the mutants in Grimlord's army as well as a key lieutenant. His battle with Ryan resulted in failure however. With Grimlord disappointed, he arranged for Dark Heart's execution. Dark Heart escaped with Ryan's help and joined him in assaulting the Virtual Dungeon. Both of them managed to escape before the Virtual Dungeon self-destructed and Dark Heart was eventually restored to human form after being wounded by Decimator. However, his freedom was short lived as Grimlord transported him back to Virtual Reality as Grimlord still needed Tyler Steele for his next plot. Outside of that, Dark Heart fits the category of Zelton's army.

Gunbots and Tankbots
Among Grimlord's forces were a group of heavy duty robots known as Gunbots and Tankbots. These robots are commanded by Grimlord and Blue Boar and were most distinguishable by their bulky appearance as well as their massive built-in firearms. They mainly serve as backup or support during a battle whenever a single mutant challenges Ryan. These robots are often transported in black minivans.

Air Stryker
Air Stryker (voiced by Dave Mallow) is a humanoid helicopter who serves as an aerial lieutenant. He usually fires missiles from his wrist. In one event, he collided with Ryan causing the Trooper to experience amnesia. He continued to do aerial attacks alongside Fighterbot after Grimlord upgraded to the Virtual Dark Fortress in the second season. Fits the category of Blue Boar's army.

Fighterbot
Fighterbot (voiced by Tom Wyner) is a humanoid jet who is often paired with Air Stryker. He mainly does reconnaissance or aerial assaults with him. Like Air Stryker, General Ivar, and Colonel Icebot, he continued to serve Grimlord after the Virtual Dungeon's destruction. Fits the category of Blue Boar's army.

Tankatron
Tankatron (voiced by Michael Sorich) is a tank robot that can blast lasers from his ear cannons and finger cannons. He is one of Grimlord's prominent Gunbots. Fits the category of Blue Boar's army.

Cannon Nose
Cannon Nose is a walking humanoid tank that can blast artillery from his nose. He is one of Grimlord's prominent Gunbots. Fits the category of Blue Boar's army.

Ballistix
Ballistix is a humanoid rocket silo and one of Grimlord's Gunbots who has missile launchers on his shoulders and on his chest. Fits the category of Blue Boar's army.

Renegade
Renegade (voiced by Scott Page-Pagter) was a master assassin and marksman dressed in red spandex with white armor and fancied himself as one of the best. When it came to hunting down the rogue robot Dark Heart, Grimlord sent Renegade. When his head was damaged by Ryan, Renegade gained an upgraded head with a winged snake ornament on his forehead. Renegade also lost on his first encounter with Dark Heart; but after their second encounter, he successfully defeated and damaged Dark Heart. Renegade made further appearances in the show. Now with an upgraded and specially made handgun, to fight Ryan, Renegade proved very formidable and would have won against Ryan if the Ghost Biker hadn't saved Ryan. Renegade fits the category of Zelton's army since Zelton briefly took the form of him.

Red Python
Red Python (voiced by Wendee Lee) is a VR Trooper created by Colonel Icebot when he was finally successful in creating an evil VR Trooper with Tyler Steele's knowledge. However, the Red Python required a human spirit to harness her full powers. Meanwhile, the Troopers made a new friend named Amy (who is played by Wendee Lee herself on screen). Amy was exactly the person Grimlord wanted to become the Red Python. Skugs captured Amy and she was brainwashed and given her new powers. The Red Python proved very formidable and almost killed Kaitlin. JB vowed to get revenge. However, Col. Icebot wasn't as successful as he hoped. The Red Python's powers were slowly becoming unstable and any further battles would lead to her self-destruction. Amy's physical well-being and mental health were also in jeopardy. During her last battle with JB, her powers gave up completely. The Troopers were able to save Amy before she was destroyed.

Skugs
The Skugs are Grimlord's foot soldiers. Their bodies are black, their heads are gold, and they wear capes. When two or more Skugs touch each other, they vaporize. Some Skugs can take their heads off and use them as bombs. Skugs also occasionally pilot Grimlord's various vehicles and man virtual outposts. Skugs usually take the form of human beings when carrying out Grimlord's agendas and travel in twos or threes. In human form, Skugs apparently gained more individuality and intelligence than they normally have in their true forms, as evidenced by Ziktor's secretaries and inventor Strickland. When confronted by the Troopers, they change into their true form and split into a few more to increase the difficulty against their adversaries. They can shift through solid floors back into virtual reality. If the Troopers can't beat the Skugs in our world, then they must fight them in the "Battle Grid" (which is a last virtual outpost in a black hole) in a life or death situation. These characters are similar to the Putty Patrollers and Z Putty Patrollers and other foot soldiers in future Power Rangers seasons.

There are a rare occasion of Skugs known as Mutant Skugs that would often be seen accompanying the mutants and cyborgs associated with Decimator, Zelton, Toxoid, and Blue Boar. The Mutant Skugs were trained in ninjitsu.

The Skugs would later be upgraded to Ultra Skugs (see below), powered by Tyler Steele's technology. They begin as regular Skugs in traditional Trooper battles, but can transform to this form of drastically different warriors by posing towards one another in a fighting stance. They are significantly more difficult in this form, however they could still be eliminated the same way as the regular Skugs (that is by knocking them against one another).

Virtual Air Force
The Virtual Air Force serve as Grimlord's air force which he uses to attack the reality barrier. All of the virtual air forces derive from Jikuu Senshi Spielban.

Quantum Cruisers
The Quantum Cruisers are a bunch of shark-shaped flying battleships that are often led by General Ivar. They attack with lightning bolts, and bombs dropped from their 'mouths'. All of the virtual battleships from Jikuu Senshi Spielban.

Virtual Fighters
The Virtual Fighters look like regular fighter jets, except that they have conjoined tail stabilizers that form a triangle, and a curved prong on each side of their nose. The curved prongs fire lightning bolts. All of the virtual fighter from Jikuu Senshi Spielban.

Virtual Dungeon's Mutants and Cyborgs
Here is a comprehensive list of several other Mutants and Cyborgs they infested the Dungeon (in order of appearance by episode airdate), but made one or few other appearances in the series:

Kongbot
 First Appearance: "The Battle Begins" Pt. 1 (09/03/94)
 Voice Actor: Tom Wyner

Kongbot is the first robot that JB and Kaitlin faced as VR Troopers. This member of General Ivar's Machine Men army is a gorilla robot with large, spiked, mace-like fists. Kongbot could launch his fists that exploded upon impact, which he did with his left fist. Unlike most mutants with projectile explosives, his fists did not regenerate. Kongbot had the upper hand in the fight against the VR Troopers, until Professor Hart informed JB that he has a Laser Lance weapon. JB then used the Laser Lance command to destroy Kongbot, he had a hard time aiming it at first while testing it out, but finally impaled Kongbot, who immediately surrendered (which would become a common theme for mutants that faced JB), but JB finished him off anyway.

Metaborg
 First Appearance: "Error in the System" (09/14/94)
 Voice Actor: Tom Wyner

Grimlord creates a computer virus to infect all computer systems, including Professor Hart. This allows Grimlord to impersonate the Professor and send the Troopers into danger and on decoy missions. Specifically, JB alone fights Metaborg, while Ryan and Kaitlin are on a wild goose chase in virtual reality. Metaborg belongs to General Ivar's Machine Men army. He first assumes the form of a small tank-like robot, and later transforms into a humanoid. Not only is Metaborg himself strong, but he outnumbers JB with the help of Grimlord's Quantum Cruisers. When the rest of the team caught up to JB, they weakened Metaborg with the VR Double Team, and Kaitlin recharged JB, who then destroyed Metaborg with his Laser Lance command. Then, JB used the Battle Cruiser to locate the virtual underwater base causing the virus and then destroyed it, returning the Professor to normal.

Laserbot
 First Appearance: "Lost Memories" (09/15/94)
 Voice Actor: Gardner Baldwin

The samurai-themed robot of General Ivar's Machine Men army attacked the Earth during the same time period when Ryan lost his memory. Laserbot fires lasers from the concealed machine gun-blasters on his arms. In battle, JB blasted the gem in the center of Laserbot's head, causing him to lose some of his power. He then meets his demise courtesy of JB's Laser Lance command after JB ignores the angry robot's threats.

Laserbot appears again in "Dream Battle" where he fights JB. JB once again defeats him, this time only by breaking the gem-like apparatus. Laserbot is a member of General Ivar's Machine Men army.

The Eliminator
 First Appearance: "Battle For the Books" (09/16/94)
 Voice Actor: Gardner Baldwin

This member of General Ivar's Machine Men army resembles the older, boxy computers and was one of the few unanimously recommended by both General Ivar and Colonel Icebot (whom seem to have somewhat of a friendly rivalry), but it is suggested that they combined their knowledge to program it with JB's battle information. It specializes in information, and attacked the Central Library. Unlike other members of Grimlord's army, The Eliminator demonstrates no language abilities. It can, however predict all of JB's moves before they are used, using downloaded battle information, preventing JB from successfully attacking the robot. Every anticipated maneuver is displayed on a monitor on The Eliminator's chest. It lacks battle information on Kaitlin, however, so when she and JB team up for VR Double Team it is stunned long enough for JB to destroy it with his "Laser Lance Command".

Slice and Dice: Swordbot Brothers
 First Appearance: "Oh Brother" (09/19/94)
 Voice Actors: Michael Sorich (Slice's first voice), Tony Oliver (Dice's first voice), Mike Reynolds (Dice's second voice), Brad Orchard (Slice's second voice, Dice's third voice), Richard Epcar (Dice's fourth voice, Slice's third voice)

The Swordbot Brothers are recurring villains who are robotic swordsmen. Slice wields a sword while Dice uses a naginata. After Ryan defeats them the first time, they give a clue that his father Tyler Steele still survives. The brothers return throughout the first season. In "Searching for Tyler Steele," Ryan faces Slice after Air Stryker and Fighterbot destroy Tyler Steele's mountain lab. In "Who's King of the Mountain?", Slice later when he assists Rollbot, only to be defeated when Ryan tosses him on a landmine. In "The Couch Potato Kid," Dice participates in Grimlord's obstacle course. In "Virtually Powerless", Dice later went one on one with Ryan to prevent him from saving Dr. Poindexter while he repaired the Virtualizers, but Ryan defeats him with the Internal Gyro Command. After the self-destruction of Grimlord's dungeon, Slice and Dice survive as mere heads. They attack Ryan but are soon destroyed, managing to inflict some pain on the weakened Ryan as well. The brothers fit the category of Decimator's army.

Hammerbot
 First Appearance: "Grimlord's Challenge" (09/20/94)
 Voice Actor: Tom Wyner

This hammer-wielding robot works for Grimlord. He is referred to as unbeatable, and destroys Zelton's The "Invincible" Blade to prove the strength of Decimator's army. Hammerbot is defeated, but not destroyed, when Ryan breaks off his helmet. Ryan almost destroys him with his own hammer while Hammerbot is defenseless, but decides to spare his life since the VR Troopers fight fair. Hammerbot fits the category of Decimator's army.

The Blade
 First Appearance: "Grimlord's Challenge" (09/20/94)
 Voice Actor: Scott Page-Pagter

Before his loss to Hammerbot in the Dungeon, he was referred to as The "Invincible" Blade. He can turn his right forearm and hand into a sword blade and his left hand into large pincer claws. Though he was destroyed by Hammerbot, he would later be rebuilt. He also popped up again later to prevent Ryan from escaping with the injured Dark Heart after Ryan had defeated the fake one. He appeared again during Grimlord's no-rules obstacle course and lost there as well. The Blade fits the category of Zelton's army.

Spiderbot
 First Appearance: "Grimlord's Challenge" (09/20/94)
 Voice Actor: Brad Orchard

As its name implies, Spiderbot is a spider-like robot. While Ryan deals with Hammerbot, Spiderbot stirs trouble for J.B. when General Ivar planned to send Spiderbot to ambush Ryan, but J.B. arrived to prevent the ambush. It fights J.B. at the top of the world. Spiderbot has many hidden tricks, such as rocket boots and an electric beam weapon hidden inside its head. After JB blasts off the monster's arms with his gun, Spiderbot uses one last trick, a ring on his back that wraps around JB, restraining him. JB breaks free and destroys Spiderbot; first he stabs it through the stomach with the Laser Lance, he was the first to not surrender, but it did give him 'heartburn' (even mentioned by JB), then cures the 'heartburn' by finishing him off so that he wouldn't continue fighting after the impalement attack (which can be inferred from his non-surrender). Spiderbot fits the category of General Ivar's Machine Men army. Spiderbot makes a return appearance in "Game Over" in JB's virtual training game.

Slashbot
 First Appearance: "Computer Captive" (09/21/94)
 Voice Actor: Richard Epcar

Slashbot is a robotic samurai armed with a katana. His most notable battle is when Ryan rescues J.B. from Grimlord's dungeon. Ryan defeats him using his "Internal Gyro" command. He survived (or perhaps was rebuilt) as he later returns to fight Dark Heart in the "Defending Dark Heart" saga. Slashbot appears during the "Quest for Power" saga as the very last mutant Ryan faces before the Virtual Dungeon self-destruction is set off (which Grimlord does after Ryan defeats Slashbot with the Lightning Hand command). After the destruction of Grimlord's dungeon, Slashbot survives as a mere head. His head attacks Ryan and is soon finished afterward, inflicting pain on the weakened Ryan as well. Slashbot fits the category of Decimator's army.

Gunslinger
 First Appearance: "Kaitlin's Little Helper" (09/22/94)
 Voice Actor: Eddie Frierson

Gunslinger is a rifle-toting cowboy robot Grimlord himself recommends after his Skugs kidnap Kaitlin's cousin Betsy. In his first appearance he speaks like Clint Eastwood combined with stereotypical cowboy language such as "Howdy, pardner", "varmit", and "draw." He wears a brown overcoat and hat, which he dramatically throws off at the start of his battle against JB (His hat explodes on the ground after throwing it), which fails to impress the Trooper. He and J.B. then have a showdown, but Gunslinger has a force-field to deflect JB's attacks. During the battle, one of Gunslinger's bullets creates a hole in the ground, which JB uses as a trench to surprise Gunslinger before he can activate his shield, then replacing his gun temporarily with a sword. When Kaitlin comes to JB's aid, Gunslinger flips his hand around which turns into a gun, with which he shoots Kaitlin several times from a distance, severely wounding her and rendering her unable to continue the fight. As she pleads for JB to destroy the robot for her, JB goes berserk over Gunslinger wounding her and delivers a supercharged flying kick that sends Gunslinger flying after his attempts to shoot JB in midair failed; Gunslinger's shield shorts out from the attack. Gunslinger is shocked and angered by the loss of his shield, and flails around, possibly malfunctioning, whereupon JB makes an unusually aggressive impaling attack. Despite this, Gunslinger doesn't surrender, but continues his raging, apparently trying to reactivate his shield. JB then finishes Gunslinger off permanently with the "Laser Lance" command (surprisingly Gunslinger appears to still be more angry over his lost shield than actual defeat as he continues flailing around before falling over and exploding). Gunslinger fits the category of General Ivar's Machine Men army.

Graybot
 First Appearance: "The Virtual Spy" (09/23/94)
 Voice Actor: Brandon Gaines(in the Virtual Spy), Richard Epcar (with Zelton as him)

Colonel Icebot constructed Graybot as a robot with the ability to disguise himself as a human. He is assigned to befriend the Troopers as a teenager named "Jeremy Gibson" in order to gain access to their secrets. Kaitlin develops a crush on "Jeremy" and is quick to defend him even as Ryan and JB grow suspicious. His virtual alter-ego allowed him to outperform them at reporting, computing, and martial arts. When Kaitlin and JB investigate him, they discover the virtual alter-ego that he is, but their discovery comes too late. Using computer technology, he is able to trap Kaitlin and JB in the lab (and attempt to self-destruct it, but JB stops that from happening) and rig the lab's portal to send Ryan into a virtual combat battle where he appears in his true form. In his true form, Graybot has superhuman strength and shoots lethal arrows from his wrist but demonstrated bad aim, as he mostly misses Ryan. Eventually he is defeated in battle by Ryan. He initially survives Ryan's Lightning Hand Command, but eventually wears out by continuing to battle (rather than retreating to make repairs as Zelton, Decimator, Ivar, and other robots had done before on many occasions after a tough battle). After firing his last arrow and Ryan eventually catching it, he falls in exhaustion and explodes. In "Race to the Rescue," Zelton briefly transforms into Graybot during his battle against Ryan, suggesting he fits the category of Zelton's army, despite being built by Icebot.

Drillbot
 First Appearance: "The Virtual V-6" (09/26/94)
 Voice Actor: Steve Kramer

Drillbot is a drill-based robot assigned to steal J.B.'s VR Fighter Bike in order to extract its V6 engine for Grimlord. To lure JB and his bike to him, Grimlord sends the Skugs to hijack a school bus filled with children. Drillbot then appears on the scene and challenges JB to a fight. While JB fights Drillbot, Skugs try to dismantle the VR Fighter Bike to steal the engine, but the bike is given an automated command and escapes the Skugs. Kaitlin saves the kids caught on the bus and quickly arrives to help JB, who destroyed Drillbot with his "Laser Lance command" while riding the VR Fighter Bike. Drillbot fits the category of General Ivar's Machine Men army.

Polarbot
 First Appearance: "No One's Friend" (09/27/94)

Polarbot is a shark-headed robot who is armed with cannons on his shoulders, wrist, arms, and chest. A disguised Skug puts JB and Kaitlin under a spell that turns them against Ryan. The source of the spell is linked to Polarbot. When Ryan confronts Polarbot in battle, The Blade, Chrome Dome, and Minotaurbot join him briefly, before Ryan gives them a good pounding, forcing them to retreat. Walrus meat is used as a distraction to appeal to his sharklike nature while Ryan uses the Internal Gyro Command to destroy Polarbot, freeing his friends from the brainwashing. In the "Defending Dark Heart" saga, Polarbot is seen (presumably rebuilt) in the hunt for Dark Heart where he is shot by Dark Heart in battle and is destroyed. In cut footage in "Race To The Rescue, Zelton briefly transforms into Polarbot during his battle with Ryan. Polarbot fits the category of Zelton's army.

Mutant Jeb
 First Appearance: "Dogmatic Change" (09/28/94)
 Voice Actor: Kerrigan Mahan

Grimlord creates a special formula to mutate animals and Jeb is his first test subject. Ziktor sets up a fake dog food commercial starring Jeb and slips the formula into Jeb's food. Slowly, Jeb develops unusual behavior and a bad attitude problem. Jeb eventually mutates into a dog monster completely loyal to Grimlord. He is ordered to go on a rampage by releasing animals from zoos. Ryan uses a virtual canine to bring Jeb back to his senses, but Toxoid arrives and sprays Jeb with a disintegrating foam. Jeb is saved just in time and returned to normal back at the lab. Mutant Jeb fits the category of Toxoid's army.

"Shish-Kebot"
 First Appearance: "Searching for Tyler Steele" (09/30/94)
 Voice Actor: Lex Lang

This robot is colored silver and has a bazooka hidden on its shoulder. It can also extend cables from its chest and blast lasers from the cable's tips. Jeb calls this robot "Shish-Kebot" when it's impaled like a shish kebab, but it is called "Unnamed Robot." JB defeats it by impaling it with the Laser Lance command, then finishing it off with repeated Laser Lance slashing. This robot fits the category of General Ivar's Machine Men army.

Magician
 First Appearance: "Searching For Tyler Steele" (09/30/94)
 Voice Actors: Terrence Stone (first voice), Dave Mallow (second voice)

Magician is a robotic magician/ninja. When Ryan is looking for his father in the woods, Magician appears to attack him. In his next appearance in "A Dirty Trick", Magician masquerades as an actual magician at Tao Dojo and steals JB and Kaitlin's Virtualizers, leaving only Ryan to battle. Magician uses dirty tricks including explosive cards, illusion duplicates, and an alternate dimension in which to fight with Ryan, along with disappearing all the time. Magician loses his magician outfit, and Ryan uses some magic tricks of his own to fight, making it a more even battle. Ryan destroys him with his "Lightning Hand" command and takes back the stolen Virtualizers. In the "Defending Dark Heart" saga, Magician is seen participating in the Dark Heart hunt. In "The Couch Potato Kid," Magician fails the obstacle course. He comes back again for a rematch against Ryan in "Secret Power" while Ryan and the other Troopers worked to stop the reality barrier from shattering under Colonel Icebot's magnetic fields at the North Pole. He tries to stop Ryan from wrecking Icebot's plans, but in the end Ryan is able to defeat him for good using the "Lightning Hand" command. After the destruction of Grimlord's dungeon, Magician survives as a mere head. His head attacks Ryan and is soon destroyed afterward, inflicting pain on the weakened Ryan as well. Magician fits the category of Decimator's army.

Chainbot
 First Appearance: "Save the Trees" (10/03/94)

Chainbot is a cyborg who wields a tachi and a spiked ball that are on a single chain. When Ziktor's attempt to legally cut down an old forest failed due to the discovery of an endangered insect, Chainbot is assigned to destroy it completely. He is stopped by Ryan, though his destruction isn't shown on screen. After the self-destruction of Grimlord's dungeon, Chainbot survives as a mere head. His head attacks Ryan and is soon destroyed afterward, inflicting pain on the weakened Ryan as well. Chainbot fits the category of Decimator's army.

Cobrot
 First Appearance: "Kaitlin's Front Page" (10/05/94) 	
 Voice Actor: Brianne Siddall

Cobrot is a female robot with a snake-like tail in place of legs. Colonel Icebot calls her one of the deadliest warriors in Grimlord's army, responding to General Ivar's claims about Metalbot with the assertion that "his" Cobrot's engines would whip the Troopers into whatnot. He also said that she is "all cobra", even though the only thing cobralike about Cobrot is her appearance. When Kaitlin is kidnapped, Cobrot is recommended by Colonel Icebot and she accompanies Metalbot to distract Ryan and JB when attempt to rescue their friend by attacking in a field. Cobrot fights JB in the field while Metalbot goes after Ryan in the quarry. Cobrot blasts arrows from the bow on her hand, and cracks her tail like a whip. She's also skilled at using it to grab and toss JB around. Eventually, JB decided that sniper attacks were worthless after she took away his laser lance and VR laser pistol and focused on direct assault near the end of the battle, so JB charged at Cobrot from the right (side of the screen), she tossed him overhead in the same direction he was charging at (with her arms this time, not her tail) and laughed like the Wicked Witch of the West, then JB got up and charged at her from the left (side of the screen), and she again tossed JB overhead in the same projectile path he was charging, laughing in the same way. Having had enough, JB summons his laser lance and she is destroyed by his "Laser Lance" command. JB doesn't impale Cobrot, even though she is distant from him when he summons the Laser Lance. Cobrot fits the category of General Ivar's Machine Men army, despite her being Colonel Icebot's own creation.

Metalbot
 First Appearance: "Kaitlin's Front Page" (10/05/94)
 Voice Actors: Tom Wyner (first voice), Mike Reynolds (with Zelton as him)

Metalbot a robotic boxer is one of Grimlord's deadliest robot warriors along with Cobrot. After he's recommended by General Ivar, he ambushes Ryan and JB when they attempt to save Kaitlin. According to General Ivar, his punch is unequal to any opponent's. Metalbot can discharge electricity through tentacles that sprout from his forehead. Metalbot's first defeat is by Ryan's "Laser Fist" command. In "Three Strikes," Metalbot is rebuilt by Colonel Icebot to assist Renegade, Chrome Dome, and Minotaurbot into abducting a young baseball prodigy to bait a trap for Ryan, but Ryan defeats him with his "Lightning Hand" command. In "The Transmutant," Metalbot is among the cyborgs chasing after Ryan before he fights Transmutant. In his most infamous battle with Ryan as seen in "Race to the Rescue," Zelton briefly transforms into Metalbot, therefore he fits the category of Zelton's army.

Crabor
 First Appearance: "The Dognapping" (10/07/94)
 Voice Actor: Tom Wyner

Crabor is a mutant whose tentacles are loaded with electricity. Grimlord uses Crabor as part of a trap, using Jeb for bait. After Crabor isolates Ryan, he feigns surrender. Ryan almost buys the act, but Crabor intended only to get Ryan's guard down. Crabor's main weapon is his electrocuting tentacles, but can also emit a bad smelling vapor. Crabor loses the battle after Ryan kicks him into the water and retreats to the Dungeon as a failure. He makes other appearances as a background character supporting other mutants. In "The Reality Virus," Crabor fights Ryan once more during a Reality Virus outbreak, where he reveals the ability to produce green slime on his tongue and lug it at opponents, as well as turn his right hand into a crab-like claw and breathe fire. In this encounter, after he uses his Super-Charge command to re-energize himself and get the slime off his armor, Ryan defeats him with his Lightning Hand and flying kick attacks which sends Crabor off a cliff. In "The Transmutant," Crabor is later seen as one of Grimlord's warriors that challenged Transmutant. He survived, but the first clash with Transmutant nearly kills him. In their second battle, he becomes stuck in the rocks. Crabor fits the category of Toxoid's army.

Frogbot
 First Appearance: "The Dognapping" (10/07/94)
 Voice Actor: Richard Epcar

Frogbot is a kangaroo-headed robot with leaping ability and fire breath. Although listed in the credits as "Frogbot", the pronunciation of his name as what sounds like "Rugbot" by General Ivar led many fans to incorrectly list him as "Rugbot" on fan-created websites. He is sent by General Ivar to prevent the VR Troopers from rescuing Jeb. J.B. faces Frogbot at the same time Ryan fights Crabor. Because of his mobility, he needed to be fought on the VR Fighter Bike for the entire battle. J.B. destroys him using the "Laser Lance" command while riding the VR Fighter Bike. Frogbot stands staggered for a few minutes before falling in defeat, without any attempts at continuing his attacks or attempts to retreat for repairs. Frogbot fits the category of General Ivar's Machine Men army.

Torpedobot
 First Appearance: "The Dognapping" (10/07/94)
 Voice Actor: Lex Lang

A humanoid torpedo robot who accompanied Crabor to battle the VR Troopers to prevent them from rescuing Jeb. Torpedobot was armed with a harpoon gun. He observed the battle between Ryan and Crabor waiting for the right moment to strike. Torpedobot self-destructed trying to blow up the ship that Ryan fought Crabor on. He was evidently rebuilt as he made additional background appearances throughout the series. Torpedobot fits the category of Blue Boar's army.

Trooper Terminator
 First Appearance: "My Dog's Girlfriend" (10/10/94)
 Voice Actor: Tom Fahn

An ultimate killing machine used by Grimlord to destroy the Troopers. It had deadly guns and heat seeking capabilities. To bring Ryan to the Trooper Terminator, some Skugs stole three puppies. The puppies were placed in a minefield guarded by the Trooper Terminator. Ryan tricked it by heating a rock with his Laser Fist and then throwing the heated rock at it to deter its heat seeking capabilities. While it was tricked, Ryan decapitated it and then he finally destroyed it when he threw Ballistix right onto it, causing a big explosion. Trooper Terminator fits the category of Blue Boar's army as seen in the footage despite the claim that Colonel Icebot had created it.

Fistbot
 First Appearance: "Digging For Fire" (09/21/94)
 Voice Actor: Scott Page-Pagter (1st voice), Dave Mallow (2nd voice)

Mysterious earthquakes were hitting Cross World City. The Troopers began to investigate, which brought them closer to Grimlord's underground digging operation. Fistbot, a brown boxer mutant armed with flying punching gloves and a powerful upper body armor, was assigned to stop them so Grimlord could dig to the Earth's core. Defeated by Ryan when Ryan scanned him and discovered his legs were his weakness; Ryan tackled/attacked him by going for his legs and threw him into a nearby lake, but didn't destroy him, leaving Fistbot only to be weakened. In the "Defending Dark Heart" saga, Fistbot was seen participating in the Dark Heart hunt where he was shot by Dark Heart in battle which caused him to fall over and explode. After the destruction of Grimlord's dungeon, Fistbot survives as a mere head. He attacks Ryan and is soon destroyed afterward, inflicting pain on the weakened Ryan as well. Fistbot fits the category of Decimator's army.

Snowbot
 First Appearance: "The Great Brain Robbery" (10/12/94)
 Voice Actor: Scott Page-Pagter

General Ivar plotted mutiny against Grimlord. Under the advice of a stolen military brain, General Ivar used Snowbot to freeze the military communications network as part of his mutiny. This walrus-like creature had the power to freeze anything with ice blowers built into its hands. JB and Kaitlin's VR suits were overpowered by the cold. After a hasty retreat, the Professor gave them antifreeze protection to withstand the freeze ray. The fight was in the Troopers' favor, but the monster also revealed it had a flamethrower equipped to it for emergencies. To defeat it, Ryan fired an ice beam from the Skybase to freeze the monster in place. This enabled JB to finish it with his "Laser Lance" command. Since he was frozen solid, JB didn't bother impaling him into surrendering and just went right to destroying him. Snowbot fits the category of General Ivar's Machine Men army.

Cannonbot
 First Appearance: "The Dojo Plot" (10/14/94)
 Voice Actor: Richard Epcar

A silver wrestling robot used by Grimlord to guard the construction of a Weather Control Device. In battle, he can use wrestling maneuvers, such as a headlock on Ryan. After Ryan knocked him away, into a tree, his head was destroyed. Cannonbot grew a second cannon-shaped head that was his namesake. After blasting at Ryan a few times, he was destroyed in battle against Ryan and his "Lightning Hand" command (the only time that Ryan called it the "Lightning Laser" command). In the "Defending Dark Heart" saga, Cannonbot was rebuilt and returned to prevent Ryan from making off with the real Dark Heart. In his battle against Ryan as seen in "Race to the Rescue," Zelton briefly took the form of Cannonbot since he fits the category of Zelton's army.

Diskbot
 First Appearance: "Grimlord's Greatest Hits" (10/19/94)

Grimlord released an album known as "Grimlord's Greatest Hits". The CD emitted hypnotic waves that made people into mindless zombies. When JB attacked the CD factory, Diskbot was waiting. Diskbot, a robot with a head that resembled a disc player, used assorted sizes of sharp-edged disks that he shot from his head. The disks could also double as a shield, deflecting JB's Laser Lance (a first at this point for the series), until he ran out of disk projectiles. JB eventually destroyed it in battle with the Laser Lance command. First JB slashed at Diskbot, then impaled him, giving him 'heartburn', then finished him off before he could resume attacks. Diskbot fits the category of General Ivar's Machine Men army.

Spitbot
 First Appearance: "The Disappearance" (10/25/94)
 Voice Actor: Bob Papenbrook (normal), Michael Sorich (substitute voice)

A scorpion-like mutant who accompanied Toxoid in an invisibility battle. Spitbot can spew explosive saliva from his mouth. Spitbot had a third, long extra arm coming from his back that he used to shock people with after grabbing them. Spitbot used his third arm to grab Ryan with, but Ryan was able to use it against him by tying him up with it and forcing him to electrocute himself, which almost destroyed him, them he used his Internal Gyro Command to destroy what was left of Spitbot. Before he fought Ryan again as seen in the "Defending Dark Heart" saga, Dark Heart fought against Spitbot. Also at that time, he participated in the Dark Heart hunt. In "The Couch Potato Kid" Spitbot took part the obstacle course where he used his teleportation ability to cheat for victory when it came to crossing a mine field. Spitbot fits the category of Toxoid's army.

Dream Master
 First Appearance: "Nightmares" (10/31/94)
 Voice Actor: Tom Fahn

Dream Master is a mutant robot who is capable of attacking the Troopers through their dreams. He seems to resemble a humanoid Greek Olympian and wore a gauntlet on his one arm. He took advantage of Kaitlin's stress by inducing nightmares of her being outnumbered by Skugs. He challenged Ryan to battle, all while instilling Ryan with the fear of never finding his father. Ryan fought against Dream Master's head games and won using his "Lightning Hand" command after redirecting the electric current to Dream Master, thanks to a chain that just happened to be lying around in a box. Ryan used the chain, combined it with the internal generators in his armor by using his Super-Charge command, and after freeing himself, sent the current back at Dream Master. He exploded unusually quickly from the Lightning Hand. In "Mutant Mutiny," Dream Master fought Amphibidor, a mutant who tried to cover up his plans for a mutiny against Grimlord. After a brief battle, Dream Master finally surrendered to Amphibidor. After the self-destruction of Grimlord's dungeon, Dream Master survived as a mere head. His head attacked Ryan and was soon destroyed afterward, inflicting pain on the weakened Ryan as well. Dream Master fits the category of Decimator's army.

Spikebot
 First Appearance: "Nightmares" (10/31/94)
 Voice Actor: Stephen Apostolina

In addition to the Dream Master, the robot Spikebot was created to cause more trouble for Ryan. JB intercepted Spikebot, who started out in an alternate form with the word "Edison" written on his body; the reason or purpose of this form was never explained. Spikebot did mention that he would transform into a "more uncomfortable form" into order to battle JB, and thus turned into the second and more powerful version of himself. JB did not seem to care either way, and was quick to say that the robot's new spikier form "was still ugly." Spikebot then commented that flattery would get him nowhere. The battle was brief, as JB made short work of him with the "Laser Lance" command; first stabbing him through the stomach, giving him heartburn (that scene is missing), then finishing him off, and Spikebot fell and exploded rather quickly, too, probably due to the excessive laser lance slashing. Spikebot would make an appearance in "Game Over" episode where he appeared as one of the robots in JB's virtual training game. Spikebot fits the category of General Ivar's Machine Men army.

Pollenbot
 First Appearance: "Secret Admirer" (11/03/94)

A large, white, mobile spore that was capable of floating in the air. Pollenbot was created from the same toxins used to poison Kaitlin when she inhaled contaminated flowers given to her from a "secret admirer". J.B. used his gun to suck up Pollenbot and then destroyed it with his Laser Lance. Pollenbot fits the category of Colonel Icebot's monsters.

Vacbot
 First Appearance: "Grimlord's House of Fear" (11/04/94)
 Voice Actor: Michael Sorich

A suburban neighborhood was plagued with stories of a haunted house. The house seemed harmless at first glance. Little did anyone suspect, Colonel Icebot was using the house to secretly construct Vacbot in the real world. Vacbot was constructed with various household appliances with a blasting vacuum cleaner for a right arm and a fan in his chest that could blow enemies away. He also could blast freezing ice from a built-in icemaker at J.B. and Kaitlin. He battled Kaitlin and J.B. in Cross World City. After J.B. used his Vortex Command, General Ivar's ground troops attacked and Kaitlin called for the Battle Cruiser leaving J.B. to fight Vacbot alone. Vacbot froze J.B. with his icemaker and J.B. unfroze himself by using a Supercharge command (the same command used by Ryan to repower himself) and then used his Laser Lance to impale Vacbot and then finished him off by slashing him. Vacbot fits the category of General Ivar's Machine Men army.

Chrome Dome and "Minotaurbot"
 First Appearance: "No One's Friend" (09/27/94)
 Voice Actors: Richard Epcar (Chrome Dome), Mike Reynolds ("Minotaurbot's" first voice), Richard Steven Horvitz ("Minotaurbot's" second voice)

Assisting Renegade on his missions were two bumbling (and one can assume lower ranked) robots. One was a black cyborg with a silver head and laser bayonet weapon. The other was a blue robot with a white skull-like face, drill weapon, and laser rifle. These two weren't much use in battle on their own, but they served as a great decoy for Renegade's attacks and ambushes. The black one was once referred to as "Chrome Dome" by Spitbot during the obstacle course episode (and by the end credits). The other robotic warrior is sometimes known as "Minotaurbot", but that appears to be a fan-created name, since there was no official name. They appeared briefly in "The Disappearance" when they attacked Ryan, but their first major appearance is when they appeared with Renegade to help Renegade assist Metalbot into capturing a baseball prodigy. They also accompanied Renegade (who was armed with a Virtual Vaporizer) during his attack on Ryan, who was fighting alone after JB and Kaitlin mysteriously disappeared into the dimension of the Ghost Biker. Later, they accompanied Renegade and Crabor during their battle against the Reality Virus-infected Ryan. They also participated in Grimlord's obstacle course. Due to their aiding of Renegade, and their appearance, they seem to fit into Zelton's army.

Shoulderbot
 First Appearance: "Danger in the Deep" (11/08/94)

A robot with hidden machine gun turrets under his shoulder pads. The Troopers uncovered Grimlord's operation to destroy a dam which would lead to the flooding of Crossworld City. Shoulderbot was sent to stop them so the dam operation could be completed. Shoulderbot attacked Kaitlin, partially by blasting a laser from the reddish circle from his forehead, and nearly destroyed her. Later, JB confronted Shoulderbot and destroyed him using his Laser Lance, first giving him "heartburn", then finishing him off.

Shoulderbot laters appear in "Dream Battle" where he fights JB and Kaitlin. In the dream, Shoulderbot attacked Kaitlin and nearly destroyed her again, but she escaped. Shoulderbot was not seen again after Kaitlin's dream ended. Shoulderbot fits the category of General Ivar's Machine Men army.

Crainoid
 First Appearance: "Small But Mighty" (11/09/94)
 Voice Actor: Tom Wyner

When the Troopers were turned into kids, Grimlord took advantage by having General Ivar send Cranoid, a bulky robot with two brains on his chest. Crainoid underestimated young JB and Kaitlin. He was nearly defeated by the VR Double Team, blowing out everything inside of his main frame in the center, including the brains on his chest, but got up and continued to battle, stumbling over declaring that he wasn't dead yet. The loss of his brains resulted in a loss of intelligence as Crainoid still thought he had the upper hand as he mocked JB's Laser Lance as his "kiddie flashlight" after finally regaining composure, right before young JB successfully performed the "Laser Lance" maneuver and destroyed Crainoid's remains, not even bothering to impale him because there was little left to impale anyway. Crainoid fits the category of General Ivar's Machine Men army.

Venobot
 First Appearance: "Defending Dark Heart Pt. 1" (11/14/94)
 Voice Actor: Scott Page-Pagter

A red-eyed cicada mutant. Venobot can emit sonic waves as well as spit a corrosive acid from its mouth. He assisted Renegade in executing Dark Heart. When Strickland had turned JB into the Transmutant as seen in "The Transmutant," Venobot became the first mutant to fight Transmutant. He later joined Bugbot, Crabor, Wolfbot, and the Mutant Skugs in fighting Ryan and Transmutant where he was destroyed. Venobot fits the category of Toxoid's army.

Bugbot
 First Appearance: "Searching for Tyler Steele" (09/30/94)
 Voice Actor: Scott Page-Pagter

A red-eyed lizard-like mutant. In "Secret Admirer", he and Wolfbot were escorted with Toxoid to find a flower that increased power. When Ryan showed up on the scene, he kicked Bugbot and sent him off a cliff. Bugbot hit the bottom of the mountain and exploded. In the "Defending Dark Heart" saga, he assisted Renegade in attacking Dark Heart. In "The Transmutant," he became the second monster to fight Transmutant and lose, when Transmuatant sprouted claws and struck him across the stomach. Later on, he accompanied Venobot, Crabor, Wolfbot, and the Mutant Skugs in fighting Ryan and Transmutant where he was knocked down the hill. Bugbot fits the category of Toxoid's army.

Rabidspore
 First Appearance: "Defending Dark Heart Pt. 3" (11/16/94)

During the "Defending Dark Heart" saga, Percy attempted to get back on Woody's good side by trying to relocate the virtual deathtrap that he, Kaitlin, and JB were imprisoned in. Unlike most mutants, the Rabidspore demonstrated no language abilities. With a so-called Reality Break Detector, he successfully reopened the portal, but accidentally unleashed this floating organism. Apparently, Rabidspore was standing guard to the dimension. In the first part of "Quest for Power", this same spore-themed mutant accompanied Wolfbot into attacking Ryan and J.B. as a team. Icebot had injected it with the knowledge that Grimlord syphoned from Tyler Steele, making it more powerful. Rabidspore could metamorph itself into a flat starfish-like mass and wrap itself around its opponents, as it did to JB. Soon after it reverted to its original form, J.B. destroyed it with his Laser Lance command. Rather than surrendering when impaled, it simply appeared confused, but the slashing finished it off, but according to JB, the slashing almost didn't work, as the Laser Lance was powering down as JB was finishing his slashing. Rabidspore fits the category of Colonel Icebot's monsters.

Fake Dark Heart
 First Appearance: "Defending Dark Heart, Part 3" (11/16/94)
 Voice Actor: Richard Epcar

A second Dark Heart was created and set up for Ryan to save. After Ryan successfully saved this fake Dark Heart, it attacked him. He was defeated when the real Dark Heart shot him. He was later seen in the background again numerous times during the course of Season 1. The bogus Dark Heart also fits the category of Zelton's army since he was seen aiding Renegade and others of that army.

Horrorbot
 First Appearance: "Endangered Species" (11/21/94)
 Voice Actor: Michael Sorich

A gray robot that looked like a pile of tubes with green boots and armed with a pointed harpoon. Horrorbot is a hunting specialist. On his first appearance, Horrorbot led a hunting party on a wildlife preserve to capture a pair of unusual wombats. By doing so, Ziktor would be able to tear down the preserve. Ryan, with the unlikely help of the wombats, fought against Horrorbot and the Mutant Skugs and defeated Horrorbot with his Internal Gyro Command attack. He would return again in "Friends in Need" assisting Terminoid in tracking down a special formula. He imprisoned Ryan in a deep ditch by blowing him in with a wind attack, and tried to bury the Trooper alive, but Ryan escaped and knocked Horrorbot into the ditch. Horrorbot begged Ryan to save him, which Ryan tried to do. He repaid Ryan's generosity with more aggressive attacks, so Ryan used his "Lightning Hand command" to slice Horrorbot in half and thus defeated him. Since he wasn't completely destroyed and largely remained intact, his remains were able to be salvaged by Grimlord. Horrorbot was rebuilt yet again as he made frequent appearances in the background during the remainder of Season 1. After the self-destruction of Grimlord's dungeon, Horrorbot survived as a mere head. His head attacked Ryan and was soon destroyed afterward, inflicting pain on the weakened Ryan as well. Horrorbot fits the category of Decimator's army despite being used by Ivar and Icebot.

Footbot
 First Appearance: "Field Goal" (11/22/94)
 Voice Actor: Bob Papenbrook

It was football season for Cross World City's high school team, but their coach had gone missing (he was captured by Skugs and imprisoned in a sports trading card). Coachless, the team was ready to fall apart until the Troopers and Tao offered their services. Meanwhile, Colonel Icebot created a football-themed robot called Footbot at Grimlord's request. Footbot could remove the football above his head and kick or throw it towards an opponent. When the football struck the opponent, it would detonate like a bomb. A new football would always regenerate after his football weapon was used. Footbot made short work of Kaitlin, taking her out of the battle early on in the fight. Footbot also attacked JB by attacking like a battering ram head-first at JB and knocking him down in the manner of a stereotypical football player. In scenes no longer broadcast, near the end of the battle, JB gave Footbot a taste of his own medicine when he caught the football and tossed it back at Footbot, creating an explosion that temporarily stunned the mutant. Soon afterwards, he was finally defeated by JB and his Laser Lance's finishing maneuver (impalement scene is now missing, but it forced Footbot to surrender), making Grimlord's great "football playing warrior" nothing but a memory. After defeating Footbot, the two Troopers managed to release the coach from his trading card prison just in time to get him back to the game to give his team one final play and the victory. Footbot fits the category of General Ivar's Machine Men army, despite being created by Icebot.

Terminoid
 First Appearance: "Friends in Need" (11/30/94)
 Voice Actor: Steve Kramer

A copper-colored bat-resembling robot. Along with General Ivar, Terminoid captured a pair of foreign scientists in order to steal a special formula that threatened Ziktor's control over the city's energy sources. Before getting the formula, Kaitlin rescued the scientists as JB took him on. Terminoid attacked a lot by biting. JB then found himself outnumbered when faced with both Terminoid and General Ivar. He then whipped out his Laser Lance command and swiped at both of them. He then stabbed Terminoid in the stomach with the Laser Lance, and then took another swipe at Ivar and knocked him down. JB then performed the finishing swipe on Terminoid to destroy him before continuing his attack on Ivar. Terminoid fits the category of General Ivar's Machine Men army.

Electrobot
 First Appearance: "Good Trooper, Bad Trooper" (02/06/95)

Grimlord used this electricity-themed robot to charge up the other robots. Electrobot had long cable-like arms and his body resembled that of a blue landmine with microchip detail. Electrobot accidentally destroyed Samson, while Kaitlin had helped by clipping Samson's wires. Electrobot fought JB from on top of a cliff, blasting him with electricity, making him unable to use his laser pistol to counter the attacks. JB was nearly destroyed, but after summoning the Laser Lance he managed to shake off the electrocution attack, much to the surprise of the robot. Eventually, Electrobot was destroyed by JB by the "Laser Lance" command. JB first stabbed Electrobot through his stomach long-range, tickling him which served little purpose beyond causing him to lose his balance and fall off of the cliff so that JB could fight him up close. Electrobot then got up angrily, unharmed and ready to resume his attacks, but was quickly cooled off when JB hurriedly finished him off with the Laser Lance's finishing swipe before he could launch another one, requiring much more slashing than with most bots. Regardless, Electrobot stood staggered for a while before overheating, falling over, and exploding.

In "Time Out!," Electrobot's body would be seen in the background of the scrap-pile during Knighttime's mutiny when he created Conatron.

Electrobot fits the category of General Ivar's Machine Men army even though he and the other "newer, superior bots" were created by Colonel Icebot.

Samson
 First Appearance: "Good Trooper, Bad Trooper" (02/06/95)

In addition to Electrobot and the Ryan clone, Colonel Icebot constructed new "warriors" for Grimlord's army. However these warriors looked like nothing more than ridiculous wind-up toys. But one in particular proved fierceful in both power and appearance. Icebot named this strongman robot Samson and sent him to do battle with the Troopers. Samson didn't say much and used sheer muscle and brute force against JB and Kaitlin. During an accidental shock from Electrobot, while Kaitlin was snipping his wires, Samson was destroyed. Samson fits the category of General Ivar's Machine Men army.

Transmutant
 First Appearance: "The Transmutant" (02/07/95)
 Voice Actor: Michael Bacon

Strickland invented a special green slime that turned people into monsters. However it only worked in the virtual world and was good for a one time use. When JB was seeking a quiet place to study, he was ambushed by Skugs, but was able to defeat them. Unfortunately however, he was soon taken to the Battle Grid where he was ambushed again and administered the formula. After going back to our reality, JB slowly transformed into a green-skinned, silver-haired mutant with long claws, who would then be known as Transmutant. Transmutant can dissolve into slime. Grimlord tested him in battle where Toxoid used Venobot, Bugbot, and Crabor on him. Under Grimlord's control, he was assigned to kill Ryan. In mid-battle, Ryan saved JB from falling off a cliff. JB was confused with Ryan's actions, as Ryan made an effort to reason with him. Finally free of Grimlord's control, both Troopers fought off Wolfbot, Crabor, Bugbot, Venobot, and the Mutant Skugs together. Once they got back to the lab, JB was restored to normal again. Transmutant seems to fit the category of Toxoid's army.

Wolfbot
 First Appearance: "Secret Admirer" (11/03/94)
 Voice Actors: Brianne Siddall (first voice), Chuck Kovacic (second voice)

A white-and-brown-furred wolf-like mutant who later had a detachable black spider-like parasite on his back. Wolfbot was extremely ferocious and would use his claws and fangs to attack. Wolfbot also had the ability to shoot webbing to bind his victims. Wolfbot appeared alongside Toxoid to find a powerful flower. In the "Defending Dark Heart" saga, Wolfbot participated in the Dark Heart hunt where it used its webbing on him. In "The Couch Potato Kid," Wolfbot was at the finish line at Grimlord's obstacle course. In "The Transmutant," Wolfbot assisted Crabor, Venobot, Bugbot, and the Mutant Skugs in battling Ryan and JB (when JB recovered from his Transmutant brainwashing). Wolfbot finally battled Ryan solo after getting upgraded with virtual powers extracted from Tyler Steele during the "Quest For Power" saga. Wolfbot was more than a match for Ryan, seeing as how none of his attacks could faze him. As Ryan said, Wolfbot wouldn't even let Ryan get close to finishing him off. No matter what Ryan did, Wolfbot continued attacking like nothing had happened. Later, Colonel Icebot equipped Wolfbot with a giant black spider on his back, which caused even more problems for Ryan, namely tag team attacks. When Wolfbot was attacked with the Lightning Hand Command, the spider instantly revived Wolfbot. When Ryan killed the spider on his back with the very same attack, Wolfbot fell down dead and melted into a pile of smoldering slime. Wolfbot fits the category of Toxoid's army.

Rollbot
 First Appearance: "Who's King of the Mountain?" (02/08/95)
 Voice Actor: Eddie Frierson

A yellow robot that had the ability to turn into a ball and also had super strength, which he used to toss heavy boulders. He assisted General Ivar into trapping J.B. on an old mountain which was really a dormant volcano. Rollbot kept the Troopers busy with laser-like yellow projectiles and by rolling himself into ball form and crushing Kaitlin. J.B. eventually escaped the trap and formed the VR Double Team with Kaitlin, which created an explosion, but that was only from his ball form being forced back to normal. After the smoke cleared, he could be seen charging in his normal form at JB and Kaitlin, much to their surprise. Even though the VR Double Team had no effect on him whatsoever, the Laser Lance destroyed him just as easily as it did other bots, requiring only a bit more slashing (the impalement even made Rollbot surrender). JB used his Laser Lance to promptly finish off the unharmed and very angry charging Rollbot. Rollbot fits the category of General Ivar's Machine Men army.

Combax
 First Appearance: "The Couch Potato Kid" (09/19/94)
 Voice Actor: Matt K. Miller

Inspired by the Troopers, Grimlord sets up his own ruthless obstacle course for his army to sharpen their skills. The one that didn't compete was Combax, a commando-themed robot. Combax refused to participate claiming he was already the best warrior in the competition and Grimlord agreed possibly impressed by the robot's cockiness. Combax then captured Tao's nephew Ricky, which then lured Ryan to the obstacle course with overwhelming odds. Ryan eventually survived the obstacle course and defeated/destroyed Combax with the "Lightning Hand" command. After the self-destruction of Grimlord's dungeon, Combax survived as a mere head. His head attacked Ryan and was soon destroyed afterward, inflicting pain on the weakened Ryan as well. Combax fits the category of Decimator's army.

Mechanoid
 First Appearance: "The Old Switcheroo" (02/10/95)
 Voice Actor: Kirk Thornton

This oversized copper-colored robot was assigned to guard the special transference device that accidentally caused Ryan and Jeb to switch bodies. His bulky structure which Kaitlin described as a "walking jukebox" has a heavy claw arm along with very powerful armor which made the battle difficult for JB and Kaitlin. He kept tossing JB and Kaitlin back and forth and even their VR Double Team attack only tickled Mechanoid. Afterwards, they tried the "hands on" approach, which was met with even less success, as the jukebox monster tossed them over a cliff and seemed to have them cornered at one point, but somehow they found their way back into the battle arena where Dr. Unger's transformation device happened to be. In the middle of the battle, Ryan attempted to transform after hearing that they were being overpowered by Mechanoid, but Jeb was wearing Ryan's Virtualizer. So Jeb ended up transforming to battle Decimator. Meanwhile, JB summoned his "Laser Lance" command, even though it didn't seem to be effective at first. JB's impalement attack only tickled, and in scenes no longer broadcast, Mechanoid mockingly laughed off the initial slashing, soon catching JB's laser lance in his bulky claw arm, knocking JB backwards, pushing him into the ground, and throwing him a great distance. The Skybase was then summoned to use its missiles, generally reserved for aircraft, on Mechanoid, which greatly weakened and stunned the robot, where broadcast scenes resume is when JB came back and quickly repowered the laser lance while slashing more rapidly than before, dodging attacks, and eventually finishing off the now weakened Mechanoid with Laser Lance slashing as he soon overheated and fell backwards and exploded. After Mechanoid was destroyed by JB and the Laser Lance apparently ran out of power afterwards, Grimlord angrily blew up the device causing Ryan and Jeb to switch back. Mechanoid fits the category of General Ivar's Machine Men army even though it was Colonel Icebot that constructed him.

Fiddlebot
 First Appearance: "Fiddler on the Loose" (02/14/95)
 Voice Actor: Michael McConnohie

Grimlord was fed up with Colonel Icebot's robots, so he decided to make one himself. To finish his creation, he ordered Skugs to capture Kaitlin's cousin Keith, a member of the Young Dubliners. Keith was imprisoned within Fiddlebot's body. As Fiddlebot, he could attack simply by playing a fanfare on his fiddle, which in turn would scramble Ryan's circuits, rendering him unable to move. He was impervious to all of Ryan's attacks. Ryan eventually defeated him by distracting him with a surprise "Lightning Hand" attack (which actually didn't harm him, but apparently exposed his power source). The "power cell", which held Keith inside, who powered Fiddlebot, was then removed from the robot by Ryan, and Keith was freed from the virtual imprisonment. Luckily, Keith was completely unharmed and Ryan was then able to rescue Keith. The actual robot's fate remains unknown, since it was never destroyed in battle. Fiddlebot fits the category of Zelton's army, despite being supposedly created by Grimlord.

Vanbot
 First Appearance: "New Kids on the Planet" (02/20/95)
 Voice Actor: Bob Papenbrook

Vanbot was a black van-themed robot used to kidnap the pair of alien children. He could disguise himself as a regular van and switch into his true form at will, trapping his occupants inside. JB managed to hang on to his back and shoot his rear end slowing him down so Ryan and Kaitlin were able to rescue the children, and while Vanbot was busy complaining about having his newly repaired rear end shot at and bragging about his equipped features as if he were a real van, JB was able to defeat him with his "Laser Lance" command while riding on his VR Fighter Bike. Vanbot fits the category of General Ivar's Machine Men army.

Skullbot
 First Appearance: "Message From Space" (02/22/95)
 Voice Actor: Tom Wyner

A Grim Reaper-themed robot with a scythe blade in place of a left hand. A scientist was delivering a message to Ryan concerning Tyler Steele. Skullbot and the Skugs intercepted the message, replaced the scientist with a robotic double, and set up a fake briefcase filled with explosives. Before his second battle Zelton implanted him with an explosive device. Once the Troopers discovered the fake briefcase, they saved the real scientist and Ryan defeated Skullbot by hitting him where the bomb was triggering it. Skullbot fits the category of Zelton's army.

Robot-Faced Skug
 First Appearance: "Message From Space" (02/22/95)

When JB and Kaitlin were on a mission to rescue the scientist kidnapped by Skullbot and the Skugs, one of the Skugs had a robot face underneath the Skug face. It was much stronger than a normal Skug. Before it even had a chance to attack him, JB managed to destroy it with his Laser Lance command.

Amphibidor
 First Appearance: "Searching for Tyler Steele" (09/30/94)
 Voice Actor: Mike Reynolds (first voice), Terrence Stone (second voice)

A green frog-like mutant who can dissolve into slime and return to normal as well as spew acid-like liquid from its mouth. He hated being called "Frogger" by Ryan, because as he said, he does not "hop across roads and rivers to avoid alligators and cars just to get home", and then added that he can go home anytime he wants to before making a snide comment about Ryan's father being unable to get home, they then began to battle after Ryan demanded to know what Amphibidor knew about his father and the monster replied that Grimlord had "special plans" for him, foreshadowing the Quest for Power series. His most prominent episode was Season 2's opener, "Mutant Mutiny", where he planned to start a revolution against Grimlord, but failed when Grimlord found out, in which the aforementioned dialogue took place. To prove himself loyal to Grimlord, Amphibidor fought Dream Master and used his slime-dissolving ability which caused Dream Master to surrender. Amphibidor fought Ryan and eventually damaged his armor. Despite interference from Ballistix and Cannon Nose, Amphibidor was eventually defeated by Ryan's "Lightning Hand" command right before Ryan called him "Frogger" once more just to taunt him while on the ground from the finisher as Amphibidor spewed the liquid all over himself before he exploded right after the usual "see-ya" he said "Looks like it wasn't cars or alligators that kept you from going home, Frogger". Following Amphibidor's destruction, Grimlord informed his warriors to let Amphibidor's fate be a warning to anyone who tries to strike out against Grimlord. Amphibidor fits the category of Toxoid's army.

Shark Fin
 First Appearance: "Trooper Out of Time" (09/12/95)

A shaman-like shark-themed robot who fought Kaitlin and J.B. in the present while Ryan traveled into the past to save his younger self from Strickland. Shark Fin was summoned by General Ivar and was used by Grimlord to guard the cave full of crystals used to access time travel. Shark Fin demonstrated irritation towards namecalling, becoming angry every time J.B. called him "fishface", similar to how Amphibidor reacted when Ryan called him "Frogger". In battle, Shark Fin could launch the fin-like blade on the top of his head at J.B. In the end though, J.B. brought about Shark Fin's doom with the usage of his "Laser Lance" command, causing him to finally drop his sword before falling over on top of it, impaled again, but this time with his own sword just before exploding. Shark Fin fits the category of General Ivar's Machine Men army.

Nameless cyborgs and mutants
There were also monsters that Grimlord used who were never named onscreen.

 In almost every episode featuring the Virtual Dungeon, a white robot can be seen in the background. This robot has a skull-like face on its helmet. The gender of this character remains unknown, though it is shaped like a female. "She" fits the category of Zelton's army. 
 An attractive red female humanoid mutant who talked with Grimlord in "Searching for Tyler Steele." She seemed to serve as a temporary consultant for Grimlord. She spoke in a haughty voice and seemed to be a mutant, complete with spikes sticking out of her back and fingers, but had a beautiful face and a well-proportioned, attractive figure. She is never seen again after she talks with Grimlord. For some reason, Grimlord and her were alone in that scene with no other mutants around. Her name is not said on-screen. She fits the category of Toxoid's army. 
 In the first part of "Quest for Power", Tyler was trying to send a message to the Professor while in a dungeon cell. However, his transmission was cut short when a red cyclops-like monster entered and said "That was a bad idea! Grimlord's gonna make you pay for your long distance call!" 
 In almost every episode two humanoid gentlemen were seen alongside Decimator's army on in the back of the Virtual Dungeon. One was a muscular wrestler dressed in white and the other was an obese wrestler dressed in red and black. They vanished after Season 1. They seem to fit the category of Decimator's army as they often stood on his side of the dungeon and were often seen with his robots and warriors. They were never named on-screen. 
 There were also two humanoid women that could be seen in the Virtual Dungeon at times. They were not named on-screen, yet resembled Strickland's secretary Skugs. They are not seen again after Grimlord self-destructs the Dungeon in Season 2 and presumably perished within it. 
 Three humanoid, unnamed (and unspeaking) "beauties" were seen briefly in General Ivar's lab. One was dressed in gold armor and another was dressed in identical armor, but it was silver instead of gold and the point on her hat was pointing the other way. The other "beauty" wore a cyber helmet, a silver outfit, and orange pantyhose.

Virtual Dark Fortress
The Virtual Dark Fortress was the secondary base of Grimlord. It was created with the activation of an energy prism containing a download of Tyler Steele's knowledge of Virtual Reality. The Fortress takes the form of an orbiting station (the exterior of which is borrowed from Space Sheriff Shaider of Japan from which Japanese footage for Season 2 of VR Troopers is taken). The interior however is distinctly American right down to using actors for this footage this time instead of dubbing Japanese footage of the various mutants that inhabited its predecessor, the Virtual Dungeon. Grimlord has fierce new soldiers awaiting his command. When it came to the end of Season Two, JB and Kaitlin sneaked on board to rescue Dr. Poindexter's robot Galileo (whose memory was being drained by Oraclon) and punched in a command to cause Oraclon to overload and the Fortress to be damaged. Thus, the Virtual Dark Fortress seemed to be immobile and unusable. At the end of the final episode, Grimlord ordered for Oraclon to be reprogrammed and the Dark Fortress to be rebuilt as he vowed revenge on the Troopers, but that was Grimlord's last scene.

After Karl Ziktor uses the prism on his desk to turn into Grimlord, he teleports to the Virtual Dark Fortress where his servants say "Hail Grimlord! Lord and Ruler of all Reality."

General Ivar and Colonel Icebot still remain affiliated with Grimlord and communicate with him through a holographic video screen much like they did in the Virtual Dungeon since they're not inhabitants of the Virtual Dark Fortress. Also, Air Stryker and Fighterbot are still available to carry out aerial attacks against the VR Troopers.

Footage for these monsters (except for Transformatron who was American-made) came from either Uchuu Keiji Shaider or Jikuu Senshi Spielban (depending on which category the mutant/cyborg fit), which were both Japanese tokusatsu shows used for the adaptation of VR Troopers.

Despera
 Actor: Jun Yoshida (Japanese Footage), Kristin Norton (U.S. Footage)

Despera is an advisor and strategist to Grimlord who also created her. She is dressed in an elegant white robe and a horned headdress, and wields a large scepter. She is quick to lose her temper and is an immensely powerful warrior. She is the sister of Desponda. Ryan once clashed with Despera, who battled him through various dimensions. In our dimension, Despera could float and blast purple electricity from the sphere on her staff. In another dimension, Despera seemed to turn invisible and attacked by throwing her staff around like a spear. Ryan also encountered another dimension, while involved in a battle with her, that was like a giant, slowly revolving crystal ball. Ryan escaped this dimension by blasting the crystal ball walls a few times with his laser pistol. Ryan defeated Despera in battle, by tricking her into zapping a trap wall in the temple containing Grimlord's secret identity. While he tried to zap her with his Laser Ray, she was able to block the blast with her scepter, but the blast bounced off and hit the trap wall. She was struck in the shoulder by an arrow, and after removing the arrow, promptly retreated.

Oraclon
Oraclon is an oracle of data and information. Oraclon gives Grimlord more information on aspects of the Virtual Realm even he has no prior experience with in any way. Oraclon can create monsters for Grimlord to use against the Troopers. He can also be a devastating warrior in his own right. In the episode "Into Oraclon's Web", Oraclon left the Fortress and took on Ryan Steele himself. He is little more than a giant circular head installed in the walls of the Fortress. In battle, he sprouts tentacles, and even a tiny body with legs, to give him mobility. Ryan was able to blast and destroy his tentacled body, thus Oraclon resulted in battling and moving around by floating. Ryan first used his "Laser Saber" command and tried to finish off Oraclon by repeatedly slashing him, but to no avail; Oraclon was too powerful. Later in battle, Ryan discovered Oraclon's only weakness was the area of space between his three eyes. Using his "Laser Saber" command once again, Ryan plunged the sword into that weak spot (his third eye), and then used the finishing swipe which successfully destroyed him. Oraclon is the only member of the Fortress crew to have been killed in battle. Although a line dropped by Grimlord at the end of that particular episode demands that he'd be rebuilt immediately...which he is. However, in the final episode, Kaitlin and JB made his circuits overload while he was trying to drain Galileo the robot of his memory, frying his circuits and computer banks in the process and making the Virtual Dark Fortress unusable until he were to be reprogrammed again. He was the only major villain this season to be destroyed by the Troopers, and he was destroyed twice at that.

Doom Master
 Actor: Kazuhiko Kubo (Japanese Footage), T. J. Storm (U.S. Footage)

Doom Master is a sword-wielding field operative dressed in black armor was created by Oraclon. Doom Master commands the Vixens and often the Ultra-Skugs personally when the battles require his attention. He is a proud, yet easily irritated warrior who often gets into arguments with the more rational Despera, who is quick to temper when he provokes her. He is also a rival of the mutant known as Arachnobot, whom he destroyed before Arachnobot could destroy Ryan Steele, since he didn't want to be outdone (and replaced) by the mutant.

The Vixens
 Actresses: Mai Ooishi (Purple Vixen, Japanese Footage); Corinne Chooey (Black Vixen, U.S. Footage), Mariah Shirley (Purple Vixen, U.S. Footage), Amy Tan (Pink Vixen, U.S. Footage)

The Vixens team of breath-taking and deadly kunoichis trained in the most vicious and dangerous arts of combat. They are created by Oraclon and commanded by Doom Master, and often accompany him in battle.

Knighttime
 Actor: Paul Brewster (U.S. Footage)
 Voice Actor: Wendee Lee

Knighttime is an old friend of Grimlord's. Knighttime is an androgynous humanoid with long robes that had the ability to control dreams, much like the Dream Master and speaks telepathically. Knighttime is described as a virtual prince of time travel and hails from a separate, yet savage, virtual reality universe. Knighttime once battled JB in Crossworld City and was revealed to be able to shoot glowing, laser-like projectiles from his mouth. Knighttime put the Troopers into a deep sleep where they dreamt about an apocalyptic version of Cross World City, under Grimlord's totalitarian rule. JB and Kaitlin fought old foes Shoulderbot and Laserbot while Ryan fought a monster that appeared as a giant pair of boot-covered feet. To wake up, the Troopers had to regain control of their dreams and defeat Knighttime. Knighttime appeared once again and sent the Troopers back in time via a time machine. Knighttime was called upon again, this time as temporary leader of Grimlord's army while Ziktor had plans in our reality. Knighttime revealed he could make himself transparent and non-corporeal (ala a hologram). Even later, Knighttime was eventually defeated by Fanbot after betraying Grimlord by both freezing time with his time machine (against Grimlord's permission), and building the scrap-metal robot Conatron to aid him in his conquest of our reality. He believed that Grimlord did not own our reality, so it was okay for him to freeze time and seize it for himself. When neither Ryan nor Grimlord were able to destroy the time machine individually, they both worked together to successfully destroy it. Grimlord would hold Knighttime captive afterwards, hoping to use his power to conquer the real world.

Desponda
 Actor: Machiko Soga (Japanese Footage)
 Voice Actor: Andrea Harmon

Desponda is Despera's sister. A powerful warrioress that Grimlord hired once to destroy the Troopers and control his Air Castle. She succeeded in capturing the two Kaitlins and JB aboard the Air Castle and seemed to have several forms. She remained in control for most of the battle, engaging in sarcastic banner throughout. JB managed to defeat her with his Laser Lance as well as permanently destroy Grimlord's Air Castle. Initially unimpressed with his laser lance, she soon realized that JB's laser lance was enough to defeat her. His finisher caused her to burst into fire balls instead of falling and exploding as normally would happen when used. Somehow, she survived her defeat, even though she appeared to have been destroyed (similar to how her sister's defeat by Ryan caused an explosion but she escaped to the Virtual Dark Fortress). After the two Kaitlins and JB escaped the ship and ruined Despera's evil plan, Desponda was subjected to a dressing down by Grimlord for her carelessness with his beloved Air Castle and her failure to defeat the VR Troopers, Grimlord vowed never to use another of his allies' relatives to help him again.   Desponda was played by Machiko Soga who played the similarly named Bandora in ZyuRanger, who became Rita Repulsa in Power Rangers, another Saban show.

Ultra Skugs
The Ultra Skugs are an "upgraded" form of Skug used with Tyler Steele's technology. They begin as regular Skugs in traditional Trooper battles, but can transform to this form of drastically different warriors by posing towards one another in a fighting stance. The appearance of the Ultra Skugs is completely different from that of the regular skugs, because the Skugs and Ultra Skugs originated from different Japanese shows. Ultra Skugs wear blue costumes and have monster-like faces. Unlike regular skugs, Ultra Skugs can not be vaporized by a single blast from a trooper's laser pistol, but can only be damaged by such a blast. However, like the regular Skugs, they could still be eliminated by knocking them against one another.

Gargantus
The Grimstars are often accompanied by a giant rolling robot with a spiked head and a frowning faceplate called Gargantus. Gargantus was first seen in an image that Grimlord shows to Tyler Steele before he upgrades to the Virtual Dark Fortress. Gargantus could shoot lightning from its eyes.

Grimstars
The Grimstars are flying machines with small short wings and three large thin wheels underneath. They resemble mini-carriages. The grimstars do not appear until the second half of season one. They fight alongside the virtual fighters.  In the Troopers' first encounter with Grimstars, their SkyBase was almost destroyed and rendered inoperable, although they did manage to defeat a few Grimstars. The SkyBase got an upgrade using Tyler Steele's technology, allowing them to be able to withstand an assault and destroy all of the attacking Grimstars.

Virtual Dark Fortress' Mutants and Cyborgs
Here is a comprehensive list of several other Mutants and Cyborgs they are used by the inhabitants of the Virtual Dark Fortress (in order of appearance by episode airdate). Any Mutant or Cyborg that fights Ryan would often drag him to the Indigo Sector:

Irradiator
 First Appearance: "Quest For Power, Part 5" (09/22/95)
 Voice Actor: Dave Mallow

Irradiator was the first of a new breed of monsters created by Oraclon. Irradiator was a large white robot with a sharp hook on his right arm and a twin cannon on his shoulder. He is a combination of technology and animal savagery, according to Oraclon. JB and Kaitlin were given a power boost using Tyler Steele's technology to combat the new robot, but that initially didn't seem to aid in defeating him. JB managed to cut off Irradiator's arms and kick off his head, but Irradiator continued to attack. Irradiator used his dismembered body parts as grenades. Luckily for JB, his "Laser Lance Command" was also given an upgrade and power boost, otherwise it would have been ineffective. First JB stabbed him through the stomach, giving him heartburn, then finished him off. The fact that Irradiator did not surrender upon impalement despite the heavy power boost to the laser lance and was still hard to defeat signaled what was to come from Grimlord's new technological capabilities. Even though Irradiator was created by Oraclon, he fit the category of General Ivar's Machine Men army.

Silkoid
 First Appearance: "Fashion Victims" (09/25/95)
 Voice Actor: Ezra Weisz

An oversized silkworm monster with a goofy looking face on its belly. From the top of its head, Silkoid shot strong silky webbing to either restrain a victim or trap them in cocoons. He was first seen in an image as 4 out of 8 monsters that Grimlord shows to Tyler Steele before he upgrades to the Virtual Dark Fortress. He officially appeared when Oraclon created Silkoid by powering up a giant egg that it would then hatch from. Skugs brainwashed a fashion designer and used her to lure JB and Kaitlin into a trap where Silkoid imprisoned them inside cocoons. Ryan was on a race against time because anyone trapped in a cocoon would become monsters themselves in 24 hours. Destroyed by Ryan and his Laser Ray/Laser Saber combo, thus freeing JB and Kaitlin from the cocoons. Silkoid fits the category of Oraclon's monsters.

Gameoid
 First Appearance: "Game Over" (09/26/95)

A grayish-green bug-eyed mutant with horns created by JB. JB was adding the finishing touches to a VR simulation game on his laptop computer to help the Troopers with their training. Gameoid was the embodiment of the Troopers' worst fears. Once Grimlord stole the game, Oraclon extracted the monster to face off with Ryan. Gameoid hatched from one of Oraclon's powered-up eggs. In battle, Gameoid could bind Ryan with a vine-like appendage, and also blast electrical bolts from his bug-eyes at Ryan while they were in the Indigo Zone. Destroyed by Ryan's Laser Ray. When the Troopers returned to the lab, JB was able to successfully erase the game from his computer. Even though JB originally created him, Gameoid fits the category of Oraclon's monsters.

Octobot
 First Appearance: "Watered Down" (09/27/95)

An octopus-themed mutant. He had tentacles for arms as well as several other tentacles draped over his body as if part of a robe. He can also shoot slime balls. He spread a substance called the VR Shield on the beach offshore and in the water which would prevent the Troopers from transforming. He was modified with the VR Shield by Colonel Icebot and he trapped Ryan underwater when he was scuba diving upon the discovery of the VR Shield substance. With Ryan's air supply and time running out, JB had to act quickly. He burrowed under the ocean with the Battle Cruiser to attack the lab that was supplying the substance, then went after Octobot who was now on the beach, knowing that when the monster was destroyed, the substance's power would fade. First, he was weakened by the VR Double Team attack, then destroyed by JB's "Laser Lance" command. After he was destroyed, Ryan was rescued and safe from drowning. Octobot fits the category of Col. Icebot's monsters.

Scissor Fist
 First Appearance: "The Negative Factor" (10/02/95)
 Voice Actor: Stephen Apostolina

Grimlord constructed a device that sent people into a ghostly dimension called the Negative Zone. With JB and Kaitlin trapped in the Negative Zone, only Ryan stood in the way while Jeb, who was the only one able to see the ghostly JB and Kaitlin, had to enter the dimension via a VR Visor interface. Doom Master and the Vixens quickly called for Scissor Fist, a very strange creature with wool spindle for a head and a ram's head embedded on its abdomen. Scissor Fist carried a staff with a giant pair of scissors attached, hence the name. He was defeated in the Indigo Sector by Ryan and his "Laser Saber" command, but not before Ryan summoned the Troopertron (a robot the Skybase transformed into) for the first time to get rid of the incoming air fleet. After defeating Scissor Fist, Ryan managed to locate the Negative Zone device and deactivate it, while Jeb was able to get Kaitlin and JB out of the Negative Zone and bring them back to reality. Scissor Fist fits the category of Oraclon's monsters, despite not being shown as one of Oraclon's creations.

Stingbot
 First Appearance: "Kaitlin Through the Looking Glass, Part 1" (10/03/95)

This yellow-and-gray bee-themed robot was sent by General Ivar to the basement of the Underground Voice Daily to create massive tremors by using his stingers and literally eating his way through the foundation of the building. Stingbot was used as a distraction for the Troopers while a Skug (incognito) went into Kaitlin's purse and replaced her mirror with an identical one which was really the Virtual Mirror Replicator, the device that would eventually create her evil duplicate. Ryan battled against Stingbot in the basement of the building, and in that battle, Stingbot spewed out an acidic liquid that could disintegrate anything instantly. He nearly landed a shot on Ryan but Ryan somersaulted out of the way, causing the liquid to hit a block instead. Stingbot then left just as the replicator was put into Kaitlin's purse, saying his "work was done". Later, he launched another attack on the Troopers, accompanied by Ivar and a band of Skugs, and J.B. and Kaitlin went after them. However, the Troopers were soon joined by Kaitlin's duplicate, who agreed to do so after some convincing from Ryan. When Stingbot tried to disintegrate J.B. and the city, J.B. called for the Vortex Command to take everyone back to Virtual Reality. Stingbot also attacked by launching robotic wasps at J.B. and the two Kaitlins, which then inserted their stingers into the Troopers and tried to fry their circuits. After J.B. got his wasp off him, as well as the others off the Kaitlins, Stingbot spewed more liquid at him, but missed and hit a large rock (which also disappeared). He was then hit by attacks from both of the Kaitlins, greatly weakened as a result. A group of four Skugs rushed at the Troopers to defend Stingbot, and at that point J.B. activated the Laser Lance command. He sliced his way through all of the Skugs, and then to sting the bee himself, he impaled Stingbot, then used the finishing swipe on him, destroying everyone in one fell swoop, and creating a massive explosion. Stingbot fits the category of General Ivar's Machine Men Army.

Serpentoid
 First Appearance: "Kaitlin Through the Looking Glass, Part 2" (10/04/95)
 Voice Actor: Bob Papenbrook

Despite the name, Serpentoid is a red roller skates-themed robot. He had bull-like horns and a big, straight set of teeth on his open mouth, along with body armor and a body that resembled a giant rollerskate. After J.B. knocked out some Ultra Skugs that were loading in boxes of mirror replicators, Despera summoned Serpentoid to confront J.B. When he faced J.B., he spit out spherical projectiles at him, and then he raced off on his rollerskates. When J.B. gave chase, Serpentoid tossed what looked like small umbrellas at him. He can also stretch his arms and neck to fit his needs. Serpentoid also seemed to be somewhat cowardly, and panicked when Ryan used his Drill Tank to destroy the mirror replicator factory. When he was confronted by J.B. and both of the Kaitlins, Serpentoid seemed to cower in fear of the Troopers, and appeared to overheat a bit when attacked by all three before recovering, and in the end J.B. managed to destroy Serpentoid with the "Laser Lance" command. First stabbing him through the stomach, giving him heartburn, then finishing him off. Serpentoid fits the category of General Ivar's Machine Men army.

Photobot
 First Appearance: "Kaitlin Goes Hollywood" (10/09/95)
 Voice Actor: Terrence Stone

Half movie camera, half robot. Grimlord planned to use him to destroy the Troopers, and then photograph the loss for all to see. In battle, Photobot could blast a power laser from his camera lens-resembling eye. First JB and Kaitlin (who used her "Double Team command" in battle for the first time) attacked with a VR Double team, which didn't help much, and the Laser Lance impalement appeared to only tickle him, but the slashing finished him off as typical. Eventually defeated by JB's "Laser Lance" command while in battle. Afterwards, the two Kaitlins re-merge as one by saying "VR Kaitlin Double Team Retroform command, now!". Though he was created by Colonel Icebot and merely tested by General Ivar, Photobot fits the category of General Ivar's Machine Men army.

Chlorophoid
 First Appearance: "Grimlord Takes Root" (10/10/95)

A tree-themed robot who was one of two mutants (the other being Vegbot) created from a deadly vine. One of his main attacks were growing his long vines, that extended from his arms, that could bind and shock enemies. JB temporarily broke free using his VR laser pistols, the Kaitlins did the same. Chlorophoid fought against JB and the two Kaitlins like this for a while, but as soon as JB got free, Chlorophoid was defeated and destroyed by JB's "Laser Lance" command. First Chlorophoid was impaled, he threw his arms up, trying to show surrender while letting out an emphatic "yeeEEOOOoow!", but the vine extensions from his arms were so long that he eventually tripped, and fell, making it easy to slash him to death (even though he already surrendered). Chlorophoid fits the category of General Ivar's Machine Men army, despite being created from a vine.

Vegbot
 First Appearance: "Grimlord Takes Root" (10/10/95)

A shrub-themed mutant who was created from the same deadly vine that Chlorophoid was also created. Vegbot was green in color and had actual branches with leaves on the upper half of his body, near his head. He had the ability to wrap vines around an opponent and at one point sprouts one of those vines from his mouth. Vegbot could blast electricity from his eyes and could bind and shock Ryan with his vines. Fought against and defeated by Ryan and his "Laser Saber" command, after Chlorophoid met the same fate with J.B.'s "Laser Lance" command. Vegbot fits the category of Oraclon's monsters, despite being created from a vine.

Transgressor
 First Appearance: "The Disk" (10/11/95)
 Voice Actor: Steve Kramer

Transgressor is a dark green piranha-like mutant with a demonic face, that has very large, bulgy eyes and a red mohawk that runs down along his back. He also has a drill for a right arm and wielded a hammer-like spear and a ball-and-chain weapon in battle. He is sent by Oraclon and accompanies the Grimstars in an attack upon the Troopers. He was aided by Doom Master, who set a trap to capture Ryan in an attempt to retrieve a disk that seemingly contained a program that could destroy the VR Troopers' powers. Transgressor seemed to be unfazed by Ryan's VR Laser Ray. Ryan used the "Laser Ray" Command to destroy his ball-and-chain weapon, causing the ball to actually explode on him, then used the finishing swipe on Transgressor himself, destroying him. Transgressor fits the category of Oraclon's monsters.

Arachnabot
 First Appearance: "Virtual Venom" (10/16/95)
 Voice Actor: Stephen Apostolina

This warrior seemed to be a human being who was dressed in a spider-themed green-and-red armor. He guarded a spider that accelerated a person's age, the one that attacked both J.B. and Kaitlin. He was also Doom Master's rival, after Grimlord offered him Doom Master's job if his plan was successful. Afterwards, he sought the position and almost usurped Doom Master. In battle, Arachnobot could create high-pitched squeals (that weakened Ryan) as well as blast lasers from the spider's eyes on his helmet. He also could create web-shaped electrical blasts and wielded two swords and a trident. Doom Master intercepted his attack on Ryan and destroyed him before he could destroy Ryan and replace him using his spider plan. Luckily for Doom Master, Grimlord never found out that Doom Master was the one who destroyed Arachnobot. With Arachnabot out of the way, Ryan was able to find the spider and create an antidote to restore J.B. and Kaitlin to their normal ages.

Cycletron
 First Appearance: "New World Order" (10/17/95)

A motorcycle-based robot who assisted Grimlord's plans into controlling people with mind control bike helmets. Ryan was one of the victims that went under the control of these helmets. Cycletron could disguise himself by transforming into a regular motorcycle. In battle, Kaitlin's VR Laser did not seem to affect him, even after becoming two for the advantage. After removing Ryan's helmet (thus freeing him from the brainwashing), Ryan helped JB by destroying the incoming air fleet with his Shoulder Cannon, also weakening Cycletron enough that when JB went into battle against Cycletron, he destroyed him with his "Laser Lance" command while atop his VR Fighter Bike. Cycletron fits the category of General Ivar's Machine Men army.

Obotatron
 First Appearance: "Grimlord's Children" (10/18/95)

A red balloon-themed robot sent by Grimlord to use hypnotic balloons to turn kids into Grimlord's slaves. He could spew out these balloons from a trumpet-like trunk in his mouth. Any adult that touched the cursed balloons were imprisoned inside, and soon start to float away. Ryan and Kaitlin were two of the victims that got trapped inside the balloons leaving only JB to try to stop this curse and robot. Ivar accompanied Obotatron in his fight against JB backing Obotatron up with his troops. In battle, Obotatron could release a binding, glowing balloon, as well as launch explosive laser spheres. After Obotatron retreated the first time, JB was able to free both Ryan and Kaitlin from their balloon prisons by using his Super Saber. Later, while Ryan and the VR Troopertron dealt with the incoming air fleet and General Ivar's vehicles, JB and Kaitlin (who then decided to become two for the added advantage) met Obotatron again and overpowered him, and eventually he was destroyed by JB's "Laser Lance" command (impaling, slashing and all). With Obotatron destroyed, the hypnotizations on the children were reversed. Obotatron fits the category of General Ivar's Machine Men army, despite being created by Icebot.

Lizardbot
 First Appearance: "The Millennium Saber" (10/24/95)

A green dragon/lizard-themed scaly robot in samurai armor sent by Grimlord to help General Ivar obtain a mystical sword known as the Millennium Saber (which was said by Tao to have been around at least since medieval Europe). Grimlord's warriors ransack a museum trying to find the sword. Meanwhile, the Troopers buy a rusty old sword at a garage sale, which Tao recognizes as the legendary "Millennium Saber", a sword which is strengthened by an invincible power one day out of every thousand years---tomorrow being that one day. Grimlord's Skugs steal the sword from the Troopers and prepare his attack plan. The Troopers try to figure out a way to stop the sword, though no one in the history of time has been able to do so. Kaitlin discovers that the sword is energized by lightning and when Grimlord's army enters reality, the sword begins to draw its power. The destruction is to begin when Kaitlin (who becomes two for the advantage) and J.B. arrive to stall Lizardbot. J.B. tries to use his "Laser Lance" command on him, but to no avail, since Lizardbot proves to be too powerful for him. Ryan flies into an electrical storm in his Blue Hawk and collects energy by being hit by lightning. He returns just as Lizardbot is about to destroy his two fellow Troopers. He blasts the Millennium Saber with the energy and shorts it out, giving the weakened J.B. the opportunity to finally eliminate Lizardbot with his "Laser Lance" command. J.B. went straight to slashing, not even bothering to impale, although afterward the Laser Lance powers itself down before Lizardbot actually is completely destroyed. Weakened from the battle, J.B. then plants the de-powered Laser Lance into the ground to help himself up and the two Kaitlins also help him to his feet. Lizardbot fits the category of General Ivar's Machine Men Army.

Hydrabot
 First Appearance: "Grimlord's Dark Secret, Part 2" (11/03/95)

When Doom Master and Despera failed to protect/guard the pyramid in the Isis Dimension that is containing Grimlord's identity in reality, Grimlord (under Oraclon's advice) released the Hydrabot to take care of Ryan. Hydrabot was a powerful and headless mutant with tentacled limbs with one-eyed snake-like heads on the ends and an eye protruding from its neck. It shot fire and fire sparks from the snake heads. After a tough battle, Ryan tricked the Hydrabot back into the cave he emerged from and managed to blow up all of his extra heads/limbs (with a box, presumably filled with explosives), leaving only the seemingly living (and weakened) body to remain. Ryan then put the final blow on Hydrabot by destroying him with the "Laser Saber" command. Hydrabot's explosion seemed to cause the pyramid/dimension to collapse, forcing Ryan to escape the dimension and causing him to lose the information to Grimlord's identity in the process.

Athletetron
 First Appearance: "On the Wrong Track" (11/06/95)

Grimlord had created special gold medals that would turn anyone who wore them into one of his mutants; they were then distributed to the Pan-World Games in Mexico, where Kaitlin's old friend, Tim, participated in. Surely enough, after winning an event, Tim had a gold medal placed around his neck, but the unsuspecting decathlete suddenly started feeling light-headed and dizzy, shortly after walking from the ceremony. Soon, he disappeared in a flash of light, and Professor Hart revealed to the Troopers that the medal had turned Tim into Athletetron, who was a powerful athlete-themed mutant with a trophy for a head and iron weights on its shoulders. Kaitlin pointed out that she didn't want to hurt Tim, but Professor Hart told the Troopers that destroying Athletetron would be the only way to bring Tim back, and Ryan volunteered to do the task. JB, in the meantime, would try to fend off any other adversaries and try to reverse the effects of the cursed gold medals, while Kaitlin would have to stall the awards ceremonies long enough for him to do that. Athletetron wielded a ball-and-chain weapon, a scepter, and a sword that was hooked to his arm. The mutant battled hard against Ryan, using the scepter to vault himself in the fight. Eventually though, Ryan was able to destroy Athletetron with the "Laser Saber" command, with his head shattering for unknown reasons before the mutant exploded in a two-colored fireball. Upon the mutant's destruction, Tim was returned to normal again and unharmed. Athletetron fits the category of Oraclon's monsters, despite being a mutant version of Tim.

Lizbot
 First Appearance: "Forward Into the Past" (11/07/95)
 Voice Actor: Wendee Lee

A female humanoid snake/lizard-themed mutant with slimy looking bluish skin who battled Ryan to prevent the Troopers from finding Grimlord and Knighttime's Time Machine. She wields a trident in battle. Lizbot seemed to speak with a stuck-up tone to her voice. Initially, she was accompanied by Doom Master and the Vixens. Ryan fought off Doom Master and the Vixens, leaving only Lizbot. The battle was then advanced to the indigo sector. In battle she could also breathe out sparks and blast lightning bolts from her mouth, especially when giant. Ryan temporarily stunned her with a laser blast before the air assault arrived. Lizbot fits the category of Oraclon's monsters.

Transformatron
 First Appearance: "Into Oraclon's Web" (11/08/95)
 Voice Actor: John C. Hyke

A black-armored and mechanized shape-shifting robot who took the form of a girl named Alexis. Ryan seemed to show attraction towards her, but Kaitlin and JB became even more suspicious as time went on. While Ryan traveled to Virtual Reality to take on Oraclon himself, Alexis intercepted JB and Kaitlin. When Percy accidentally spilled water on Alexis, the trap (as well as her true form), was revealed as she turned into Transformatron and started tearing apart the Underground Voice Daily. Soon, though, Transformatron ended up being destroyed rather quickly by Kaitlin and JB's VR Double Team attack.

Charmeekas and Charmadors
 First Appearance: "The Charmeeka Invasion" (11/14/95)
 Voice Actor: Steve Cassling (Charmadors)

Charmeekas are friendly little gremlin-like creatures that the people of Cross World City were adopting as their pets. However, they were actually sent into our reality by Grimlord, and if they ate too much and didn't get sent back into Virtual Reality, they can turn into the deadly mutant Charmadors. The first Charmador was assisted by bazooka-wielding Ultra Skugs and Doom Master in battle. Charmador could breathe smoke, teleport, and reflect laser blasts. He could also create his own lasers and laser spheres. After it was struck by JB who was airborne in the Skybase, it went crazy and attacked its allies, causing them to retreat and that Charmador spun around, became dizzy, and exploded. One last Charmeeka was still in the park and it mutated into a Charmador as well. After having to fight him through multiple virtual zones, Ryan was able to destroy him with his "Laser Saber" command. They fit the category of Oraclon's monsters.

Bongotron
 First Appearance: "A Hard Day's Mutant" (11/20/95)
         
A melody-themed mutant used by Grimlord to steal the musical talents of people. He can also manipulate music and had two bongos lodged in his chest. He seemed to talk like a beatnik. Fought and defeated by Ryan with his "Laser Saber" command, after JB and the two Kaitlins rescued the Krossworld Kids and their fan club. With Bongotron destroyed, the Krossworld Kids got their musical talents back. Bongotron fits the category of Oraclon's monsters.

Magnetbot
 First Appearance: "Magnetic Attraction" (11/21/95)

A magnet-themed robot with magnetic power. He bragged that his abilities were unmatched and that Ryan would have to make instantaneous decisions. He disabled Ryan's weapons and armor throughout much of the battle, but eventually was defeated by Ryan, who used a few blasts from his laser pistol as well as a surprise "Laser Saber" command attack which also freed him from the magnetism (showing that he was indeed able to make instantaneous decisions). Magnetabot fits the category of Oraclon's monsters.

Cupitron
 First Appearance: "Get Me to the Lab on Time" (11/27/95)
 Voice Actor: Brianne Siddall

A female love-themed mutant with wings who was involved with Grimlord's love spell. Cupitron was white in color and seemed to be composed of various heart shapes: head, chest, and even her spear was heart shaped and tipped. Oraclon sent down Cupitron after the mutant hatched from an egg that he had powered up. Lacking even the physical strength and hand-to-hand combat to be Ryan's equal in battle, she more than made up for it with her skill at using her spear. In battle, Cupitron could open up her spear and release several smaller heart-shaped blades. Destroyed by Ryan in battle with his "Laser Saber" command soon after being aggressively impaled with her own spear, which Ryan actually yanked out of her hands, which ended Cupitron's giggling as she started gasping for air. Cupitron fits the category of Oraclon's monsters.

Jailbot
 First Appearance: "Grimlord's Big Breakout" (11/28/95)

A police officer-themed mutant with a jail-gate on the back of his head sent to battle and distract Ryan while Grimlord turned convict "Nutty" Nichols into the Nutty Monster. Jailbot fought against and was defeated by Ryan and his "Laser Saber" command. Jailbot fits the category of Oraclon's monsters.

Nutty Monster
 First Appearance: "Grimlord's Big Breakout" (11/28/95)

A monster created from Crossworld City's evilest convict "Nutty" Nichols. Grimlord freed him from jail and used Strickland to transform him into a monster. The Nutty Monster had green skin and was very muscular and had an oversized cranium (almost similar to The Incredible Hulk and The Leader). While Jailbot went after VR Ryan, the Nutty Monster was sent after JB and Kaitlin. Nutty had a craving weakness for peanuts that the Troopers used to their advantage. They lured him back to the lab and transformed him back into a human, in which he passed out. The Troopers returned Nutty back to the prison, where he expressed his remorse for all the damage he caused, but said as a result he should be set free, making his claim dubious.

Ravagebot
 First Appearance: "Field and Scream" (02/05/96)

A furry-white ape-themed mutant with large fangs and four primate-like faces on its front torso. Ravagebot wielded a trident and blasted electricity in battle. Besides Bazookabot, he was sent by General Ivar as a diversion for Karl Ziktor's plan to build a research lab where a forest is currently standing. Ryan battled Ravagebot, while JB and Kaitlin went after Bazookabot. Ravagebot was taken down by Ryan's "Laser Saber" command. Even though he was sent out by General Ivar, Ravagebot really fits the category of Oraclon's monsters.

Bazookabot
 First Appearance: "Field and Scream" (02/05/96)
 Voice Actor: Brad Orchard

Bazookabot is a mostly rust-colored robot seemed to wield a giant bazooka-like blaster on his shoulder, hence the name. He has three round, yellow eyes: two in the normal position and another one above those on his forehead. He was sent by General Ivar as the diversion for Karl Ziktor's plan to build a research lab where the forest was currently standing. JB and Kaitlin (who became two for the advantage) managed to weaken him by the VR Double Team attack. Not long after Ryan destroyed Ravagebot with his "Laser Saber" command, JB eliminated General Ivar's air fleet with his Technobazooka, and then did the same to Bazookabot with his "Laser Lance" command. Strangely, JB didn't impale Bazookabot. Bazookabot fits the category of General Ivar's Machine Men army.

Duplitronic
 First Appearance: "The Duplitron Dilemma" (02/06/96)
 Voice Actor: Ezra Weisz

A sword-wielding owl/calculator/dream computer-themed mutant who was sent to oversee the production of the Duplitrons in an underground factory. He was, in fact, created from a Duplitron. He fought Ryan after the destruction of the Duplitron Factory. He managed to create an exact duplicate of Ryan in battle. Ryan destroyed the duplicate with his pistol, then he proceeded to impale Duplitronic with his own sword and destroy him with the "Laser Saber" command. Duplitronic fits the category of Oraclon's monsters.

Fogbot
 First Appearance: "The Ghost of Cross World Forest" (02/12/96)

A gas-themed mutant who use fog to disable the Troopers' ability to transform. He was assisted by mask-covered followers called the Fogatrons. Once he gained his transformation ability back, Ryan fought and defeated Fogbot with his "Laser Ray" command. The Fogatrons seemed to vanish in battle before Fogbot's destruction. They fit the category of Oraclon's monsters.

Woodman Monster
 First Appearance: "Grimlord's Dummy" (02/13/96)
 Voice Actor: Joe Hackett

Grimlord gave orders to Despera to transform Wendle's Woodman dummy into the Woodman Monster. He stole JB and Kaitlin's Virtualizers. During Ryan's fight with Puppetoid, Kaitlin and JB fought him and restored him to normal and recovered their Virtualizers.

Puppetoid
 First Appearance: "Grimlord's Dummy" (02/13/96)
 Voice Actor: Randy Swerdlick

A white-colored, large-mouthed, puppet-themed mutant armed with a sword who attacks Cross World City at the time when the dummy Woodman is brought to life by Despera. His power source and weakness is his nose. Once his nose is cut off, he loses a lot of his power and is able to be destroyed. Eventually he was defeated by Ryan and the "Laser Saber" command. Puppetoid fits the category of Oraclon's monsters.

Conatron
 First Appearance: "Time Out!" (02/20/96)

A scrap-metal robot used/created by Knighttime from Ivar's robotic scrap pile. Knighttime used Conatron to attack Ivar, and assist him with his attack in our reality. He only attacked once. Ivar then summoned Fanbot to counter-attack, and Fanbot ended up sucking in Conatron with the power of his fan blades, pulling him apart and reducing him to scrap once again.

Fanbot
 First Appearance: "Time Out!" (02/20/96)
 Voice Actor: James Douglas

A powerfully armored fan-themed robot with powerful fan blades that was summoned by General Ivar and sent by Grimlord, shortly after Knighttime created Conatron. Fanbot was apparently Grimlord's toughest robot ever, even though he proved to be a bit clumsy. Except for Fanbot's effortless dispatching of Conatron, there as no prior indication of how tough the battle would actually be. Fanbot talked a lot like a cross between Gilbert Gottfried and Jerry Lewis. He could emit strong gusts from his fan blades or suck anyone toward him. After destroying both Knighttime and Conatron, Ivar was sent with him down to battle with JB and the two Kaitlins. Initially, Fanbot seemed like just another adversary, meant to distract the Troopers from Grimlord's real target, the Omegachron (which is capable of freezing time), but JB and the two Kaitlins quickly found out that they'd need a lot more than just their basic attacks to take care of the deceptively clumsy mutant. General Ivar even mentioned this, stating that Fanbot was doing more to himself than the VR Troopers were. Fanbot was having his way with the three, first fighting each one individually while sarcastically asking for autographs, easily winning, then throwing them all off a cliff, and even the VR Double Team attack only tickled him, with a sarcastic "Stop, you're tickling me". Fanbot then used fan blades to suck JB and the two Kaitlins back up the cliff towards him. Just as they were about to be sucked into his blades, JB activated his Laser Lance in mid-air and impaled Fanbot with it and then finished him off by slashing him.

Forkoid
 First Appearance: "Galileo's New Memory" (02/21/96)
 Voice Actor: Scott Page-Pagter

An armored monster that wields a fork-like weapon, wears armor of various colors and a helmet with a small red visor on it, which is also mostly red with some black and gold on the top. He was sent down from the Fortress to attack the Troopers. While Kaitlin and JB sneaked aboard the Dark Fortress to rescue their stolen robot Galileo, Ryan stayed behind to battle this mutant. In the battle, Forkoid revealed it could teleport as well as toss his giant fork like a javelin. The fork appeared to be made out of cement or some other brittle material, because the tips began to crack apart towards the end of the battle. At the end of this rather brief fight, Ryan impaled him with his own weapon before taking him out for good with his Laser Saber. Forkoid fits the category of Oraclon's monsters.

Sneak peek mutants
When Grimlord was siphoning Tyler Steele's knowledge, he showed Tyler (in addition to the then unnamed Virtual Dark Fortress) 8 monster images (besides Silkoid) of what's to come:

 Funkatron is a red & green tiki themed monster. 
 Dogoid is a hideous brown-furred and green-colored dog-like monster with a long tongue. 
 Wizbot is a skull-faced warlock-themed monster. 
 Petaltron is a frog/rose monster. 
 Leechbot is a green thorny leech monster with a round mouth containing several teeth. 
 Maskoid is an orange-faced monster with a green body. 
 Jellybot is a green sea monster with a jellyfish head and starfish-shaped hands.

See also

 List of VR Troopers characters

Notes

References

External links
 
 TV.com's episode guide

Villains
VR Troopers